= List of American Association (1902–1997) no-hitters =

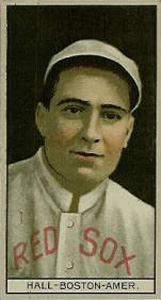
Charley Hall threw three no-hitters for the St. Paul Saints, more than any other pitcher in American Association history.

From the foundation of the American Association (AA) in 1902 through its final season in 1997, its pitchers threw 97 no-hitters, which include 6 perfect games. Of these no-hitters, 72 were pitched in games that lasted at least the full 9 innings, while 25 were pitched in games shortened due to weather or that were played in doubleheaders, which were typically 7 innings. Only three of the league's six perfect games were tossed in full nine-inning games. Five no-hitters were combined—thrown by two or more pitchers on the same team.

A no-hit game occurs when a pitcher (or pitchers) allows no hits during the entire course of a game. A batter may still reach base via a walk, an error, a fielder's choice, a hit by pitch, a passed ball or wild pitch on strike three, or catcher's interference. Due to these methods of reaching base, it is possible for a team to score runs without getting any hits. While the vast majority of no-hitters are shutouts, teams which went hitless have managed to score runs in their respective games 11 times in AA games, some in extra innings.

The first American Association no-hitter was thrown on August 10, 1906, by Harry Swan of the Kansas City Blues against the Columbus Senators at Neil Park in Columbus, Ohio. The first perfect game was pitched on May 26, 1940, by Mickey Haefner of the Minneapolis Millers versus the Milwaukee Brewers at Nicollet Park in Minneapolis, Minnesota, in a game that was called after six innings due to a six o'clock Sunday amusement blue law. The first nine-inning perfect game occurred on June 26, 1947, when Kansas City's Carl DeRose accomplished the feat against Minneapolis at Municipal Stadium in Kansas City, Missouri. The league disbanded after the 1962 season but reorganized in 1969. It continued to operate through the 1997 season. The final AA no-hitter was thrown on June 20, 1997, by Bartolo Colón of the Buffalo Bisons over the New Orleans Zephyrs at North AmeriCare Park in Buffalo, New York.

Two league pitchers have thrown multiple no-hitters. Charley Hall pitched three no-hit games for the St. Paul Saints (formerly the Apostles), giving him the record for the most career AA no-hitters. The first was a 12-inning affair, which he lost, in 1909. He won the second two 9-inning games in 1918 and 1920. Chris Knapp threw his first no-hitter in 1979 for the Iowa Oaks and pitched the opening four innings of a combined no-hitter for Iowa in 1977.

The teams with the most no-hitters are the Toledo Mud Hens (10 no-hitters, 1 a perfect game) and Indianapolis Indians (10 no-hitters). They are followed by the Kansas City Blues (8 no-hitters, 1 a perfect game) and the Louisville Colonels and St. Paul Saints (8 no-hitters each). The team with the most perfect games is the Oklahoma City 89ers, with two.

== No-hitters ==
Key
Score	Game score with no-hitter team's runs listed first
Location	Stadium in italics denotes a no-hitter thrown in a home game.
Score (#)	A number following a score indicates number of innings in a game that was shorter or longer than 9 innings.
Pitcher (#)	A number following a pitcher's name indicates multiple no-hitters thrown.
IP	Innings pitched
†	Indicates a perfect game

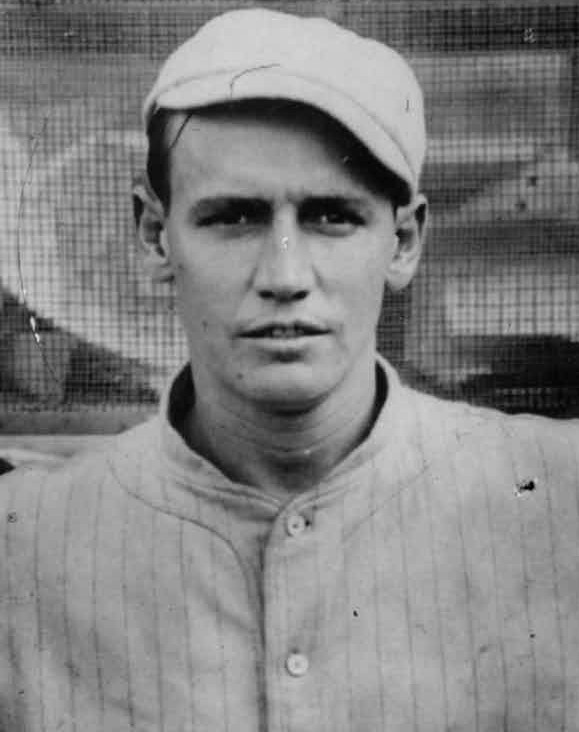
Smoky Joe Wood, who pitched a no-hitter for the Kansas City Blues on May 21, 1908, threw a no-hit game for the Boston Red Sox in 1911.

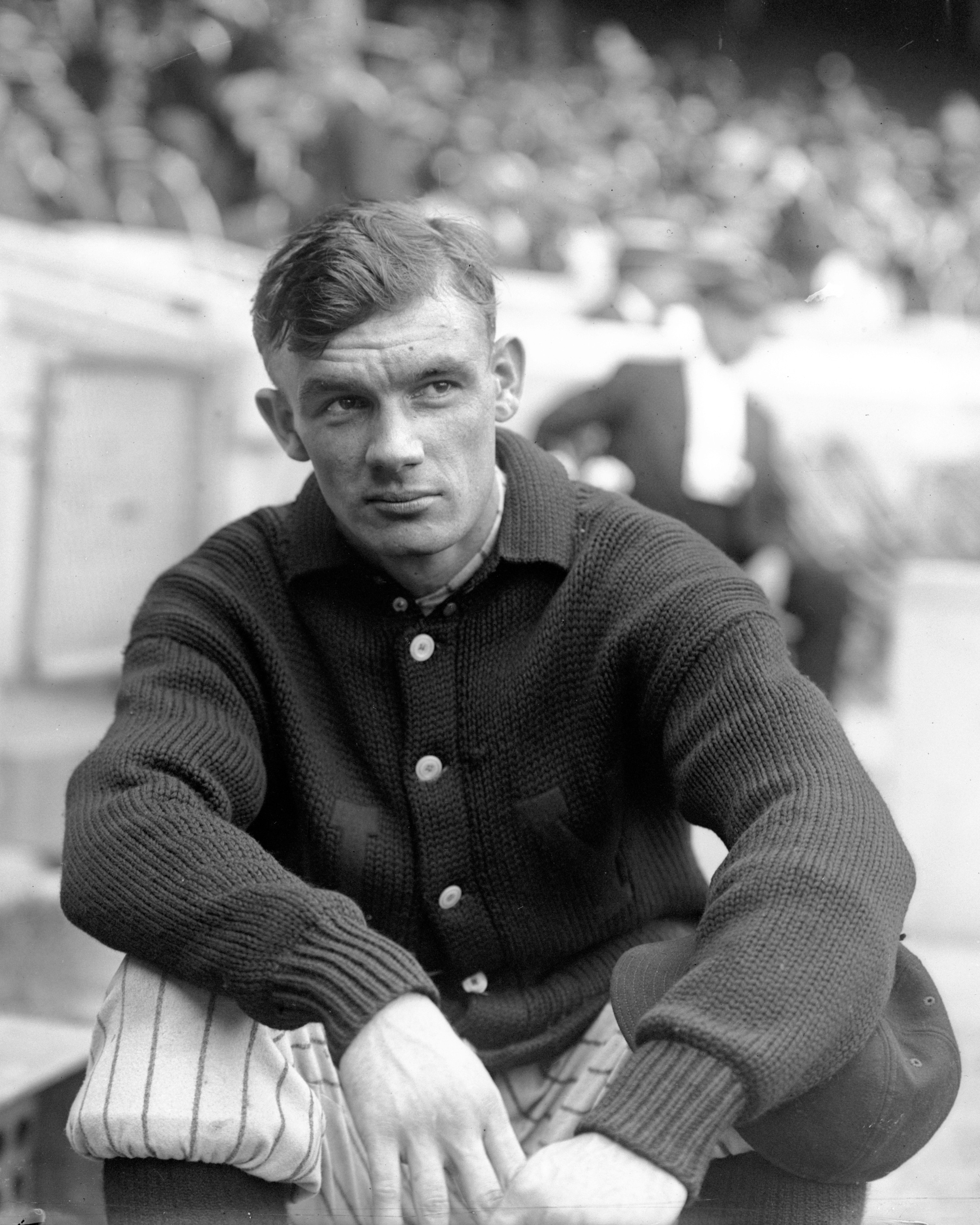
Rube Marquard, who threw a no-hitter for the Indianapolis Indians on September 3, 1908, pitched another for the Brooklyn Robins in 1915.

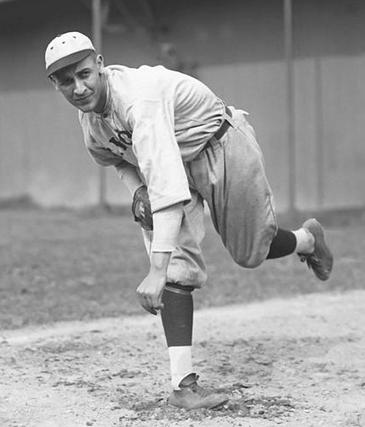
Ernie Koob, who pitched a no-hit game for the Louisville Colonels on May 11, 1920, had tossed one for the St. Louis Browns in 1917.

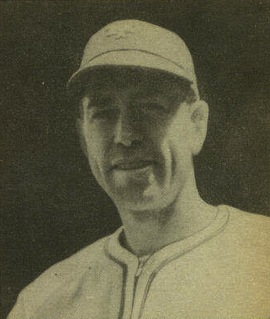
Paul Dean, who had a no-hit game for the Columbus Red Birds on August 30, 1932, pitched another for the St. Louis Cardinals in 1934.

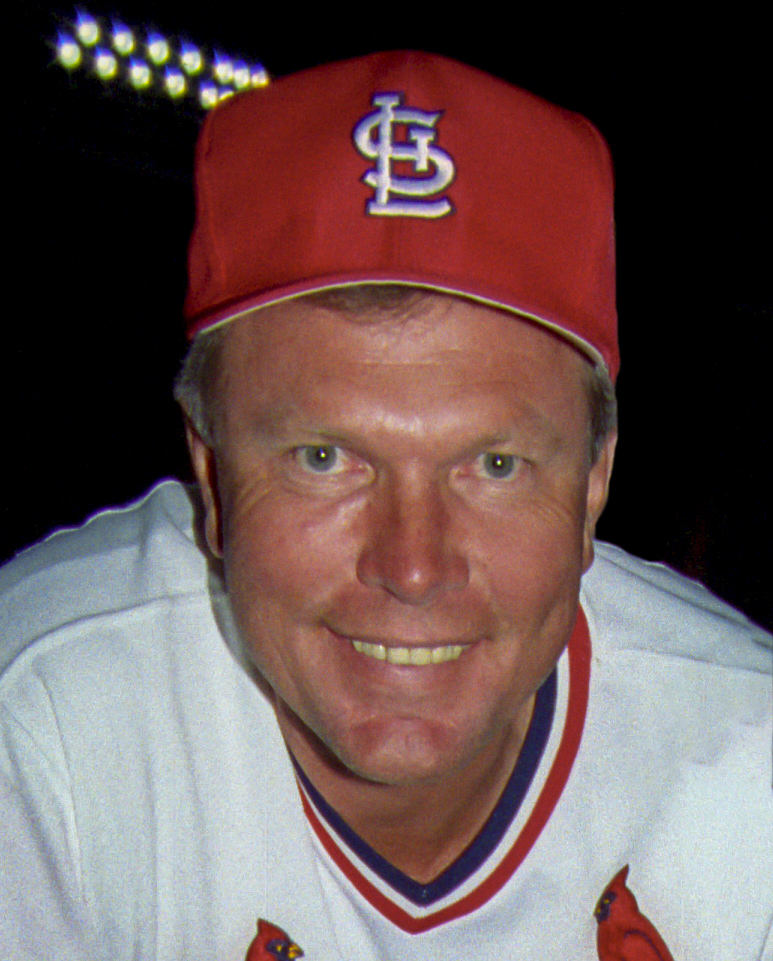
Bob Forsch, who pitched a no-hitter for the Tulsa Oilers on May 25, 1973, tossed two for the St. Louis Cardinals (1978 and 1983).

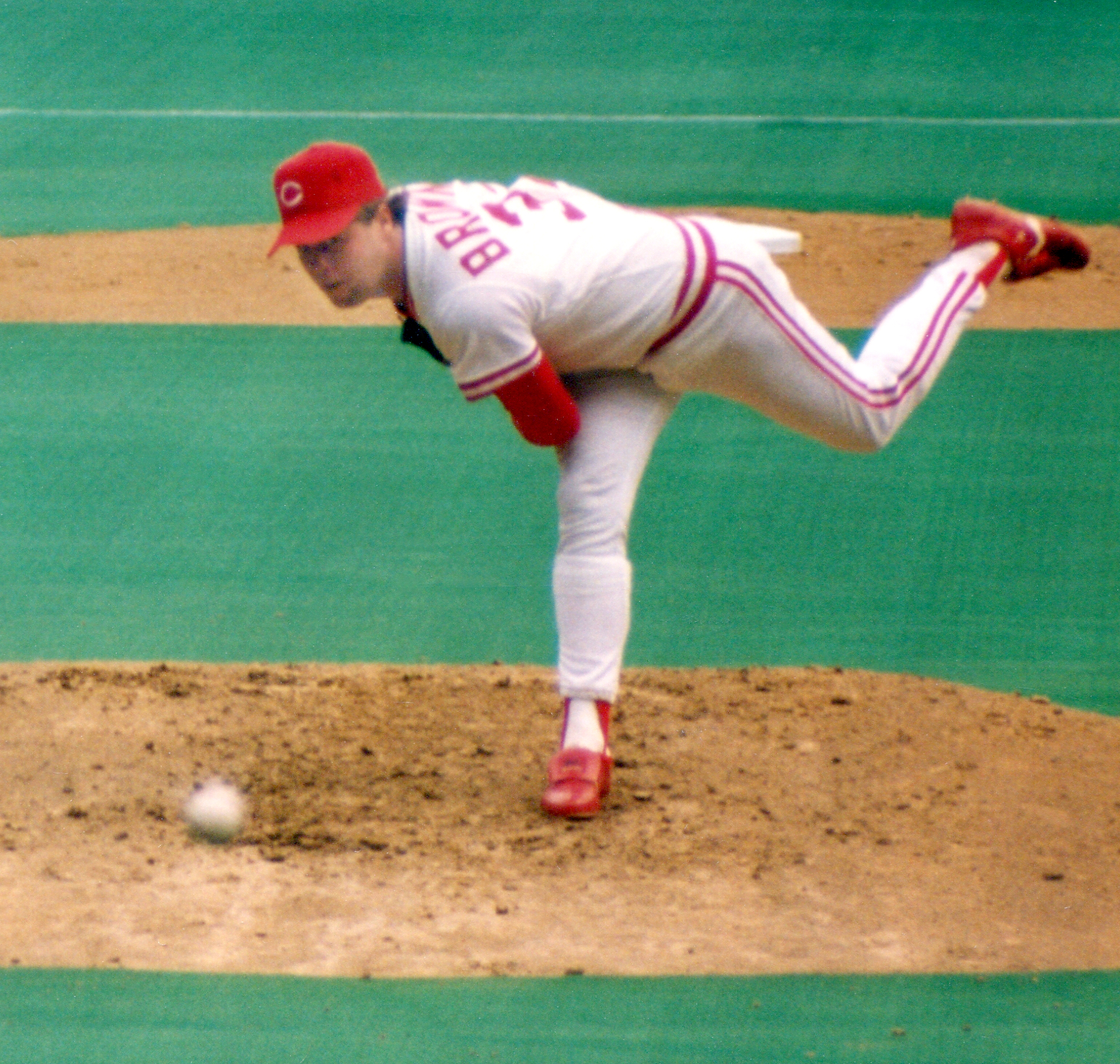
Tom Browning, who had a no-hitter for the Wichita Aeros on July 31, 1984, pitched a perfect game for the Cincinnati Reds in 1988.

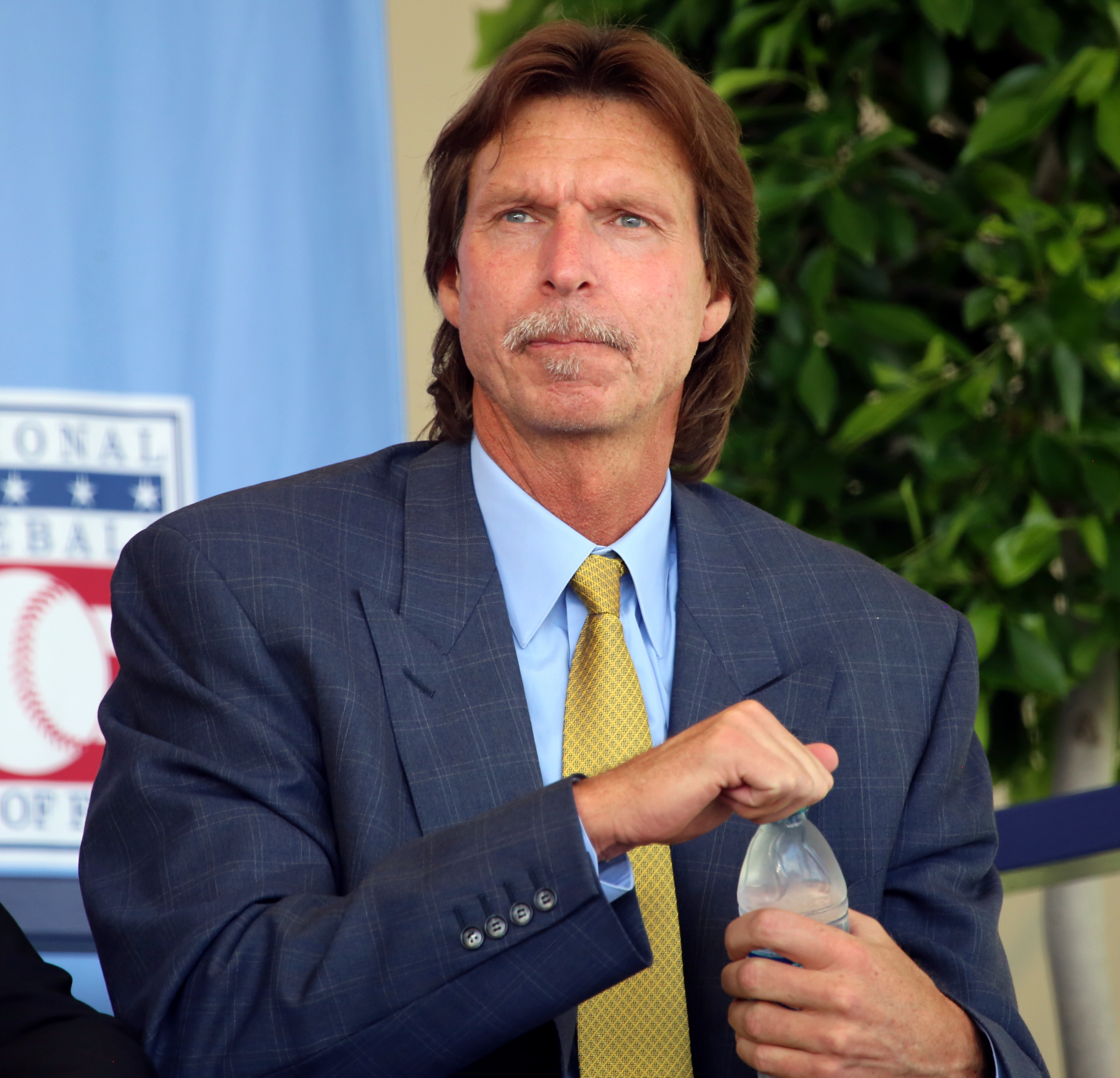
Randy Johnson, who threw seven no-hit innings for the Indianapolis Indians on August 6, 1988, had a no-hitter for the Seattle Mariners in 1990 and a perfect game for the Arizona Diamondbacks in 2004.

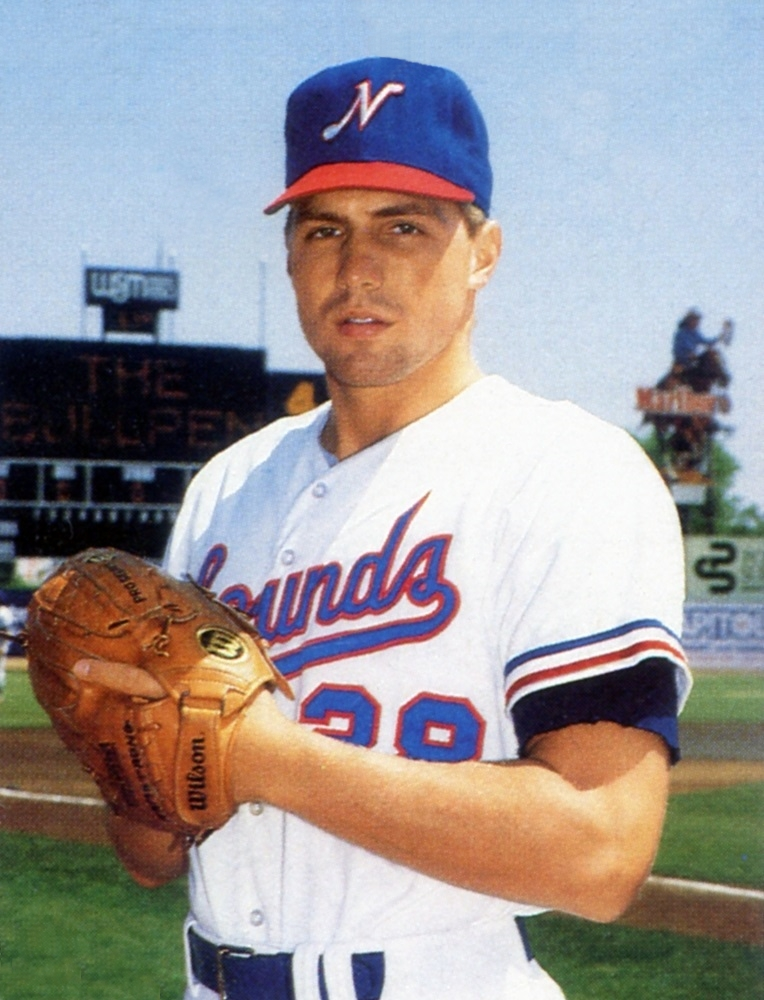
Jack Armstrong had a no-hit game for the Nashville Sounds over the Indianapolis Indians on August 7, 1988, one night after the Indians no-hit the Sounds.

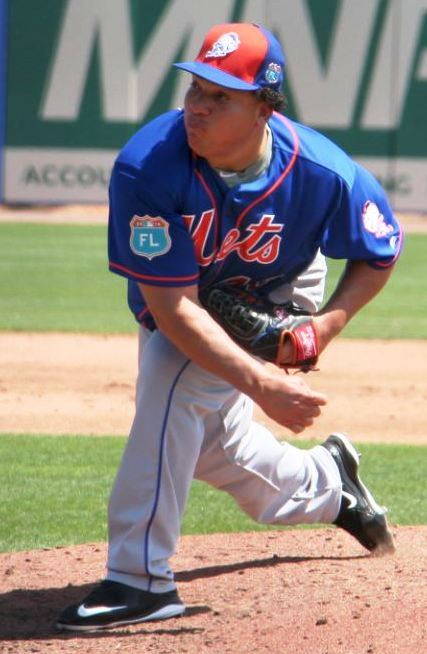
Bartolo Colón threw the AA's final no-hitter for the Buffalo Bisons on June 20, 1997.

No-hitters
No.	Date	Pitcher(s)	Team	Score	Opponent	Location	Ref.
1	August 10, 1906	Harry Swan	Kansas City Blues	5–0	Columbus Senators	Neil Park	
2	April 28, 1908	Jesse Stovall	Louisville Colonels	2–0	Minneapolis Millers	Eclipse Park	
3	May 9, 1908	Cliff Curtis	Milwaukee Brewers	6–0	Indianapolis Indians	Brewer Field	
4	May 14, 1908	Chick Brandom	Kansas City Blues	5–0	Indianapolis Indians	Unknown (Note: The game was played in Kansas City at either Association Park or Municipal Stadium.)	
5	May 21, 1908	Smoky Joe Wood	Kansas City Blues	1–0	Milwaukee Brewers	Unknown	
6	August 16, 1908	Hi West	Toledo Mud Hens	7–0	Milwaukee Brewers	Brewer Field	
7	August 18, 1908	Jerry Upp	Columbus Senators	3–0	Kansas City Blues	Unknown	
8	September 3, 1908	Rube Marquard	Indianapolis Indians	7–0	Columbus Senators	Neil Park	
9	June 18, 1909	Charley Hall (1)	St. Paul Apostles	0–1 (12) (Note: Hall allowed no hits through nine innings before allowing a hit in the tenth. Louisville scored the winning run in the twelfth.)	Louisville Colonels	Lexington Park	
10	June 18, 1910	Karl Robinson	Toledo Mud Hens	8–0	Kansas City Blues	Unknown	
11	July 27, 1910	Louis Leroy	St. Paul Apostles	4–2 (Note: Indianapolis scored two runs in the second inning. Frank Delahanty reached first base on a fielding error and advanced to second when Dan Howley walked. They executed a double steal and came home on a fielding error while the bases were loaded following another player having walked.)	Indianapolis Indians	Washington Park	
12	August 30, 1910	Bill Schardt	Milwaukee Brewers	3–0	Indianapolis Indians	Washington Park	
13	August 2, 1912	Bill Lelivelt	Minneapolis Millers	4–0	Toledo Mud Hens	Swayne Field	
14	August 20, 1912	Ed Hovlik	Milwaukee Brewers	2–0	Louisville Colonels	Brewer Field	
15	June 23, 1913	Hippo Vaughn	Kansas City Blues	2–0	Toledo Mud Hens	Swayne Field	
16	July 2, 1913	Dixie Davis	Columbus Senators	4–0	Indianapolis Indians	Washington Park	
17	July 13, 1913	Jim Baskette	Toledo Mud Hens	0–1 (Note: Minneapolis scored a run after Frank Delahanty reached first base on a throwing error, stole second base, advanced to third on a fielder's choice, and came home on a sacrifice fly in the seventh inning.)	Minneapolis Millers	Nicollet Park	
18	July 15, 1913	King Cole	Columbus Senators	3–1 (Note: Milwaukee scored a run after Larry Gilbert walked and came home following an error on a sacrifice and another sacrifice fly in the eighth inning.)	Milwaukee Brewers	Brewer Field	
19	May 19, 1915	Harry Harper	Minneapolis Millers	4–0	St. Paul Saints	Nicollet Park	
20	June 25, 1915	Dan Tipple	Indianapolis Indians	6–0	Cleveland Spiders	League Park	
21	July 2, 1915	Marty O'Toole	Columbus Senators	1–0	Cleveland Spiders	League Park	
22	September 2, 1916	Vic Aldridge	Indianapolis Indians	3–0	Columbus Senators	Washington Park	
23	June 23, 1918	Charley Hall (2)	St. Paul Saints	2–0	Columbus Senators	Lexington Park	
24	May 11, 1920	Ernie Koob	Louisville Colonels	4–0	Kansas City Blues	Unknown	
25	July 24, 1920	Tom Long	Louisville Colonels	12–0	Toledo Mud Hens	Swayne Field	
26	August 26, 1920	Charley Hall (3)	St. Paul Saints	6–0	Columbus Senators	Lexington Park	
27	June 18, 1921	Bob Clark	Columbus Senators	3–0	Indianapolis Indians	Washington Park	
28	July 9, 1925	Jimmie Keenan	Kansas City Blues	1–2 (10) (Note: Indianapolis scored a run after Elmer Yoter reached first base on a fielder's choice, advanced to second on an error, stole third, and came home on a sacrifice fly. Keenan allowed no hits through nine innings until allowing a single in the tenth.)	Indianapolis Indians	Municipal Stadium	
29	August 21, 1926	Dinty Gearin	Milwaukee Brewers	10–0	Columbus Senators	Brewer Field	
30	May 18, 1932	Slim Harriss	St. Paul Saints	9–0	Kansas City Blues	Municipal Stadium	
31	August 30, 1932	Paul Dean	Columbus Red Birds	3–0	Kansas City Blues	Municipal Stadium	
32	May 22, 1933	Floyd Newkirk	St. Paul Saints	5–0	Kansas City Blues	Lexington Park	
33	September 7, 1935	Lou Polli	Milwaukee Brewers	2–0 (10	St. Paul Saints	Lexington Park	
34	June 18, 1938	Al Piechota	Kansas City Blues	0–0 (6) (Note: The game was called due to rain in the top of the seventh inning, and the score reverted to that of the sixth.)	Louisville Colonels	Municipal Stadium	
35	September 2, 1938	Yank Terry	Louisville Colonels	3–0 (7)	Columbus Red Birds	Parkway Field	
36	May 26, 1940	Mickey Haefner^{†}	Minneapolis Millers	4–0 (6) (Note: The game was called after the sixth inning due to a six o'clock Sunday amusement blue law.)	Milwaukee Brewers	Nicollet Park	
37	September 11, 1943	Jack Kramer	Toledo Mud Hens	5–0	Louisville Colonels	Parkway Field	
38	August 1, 1944	Walter Brown	Toledo Mud Hens	1–0 (7)	Milwaukee Brewers	Borchert Field	
39	May 17, 1945	Ed Wright	Indianapolis Indians	2–0	Kansas City Blues	Municipal Stadium	
40	June 3, 1945	Peter Mazar	Columbus Red Birds	4–0	Kansas City Blues	Red Bird Stadium	
41	July 26, 1945	Don Thompson	Louisville Colonels	8–0	Indianapolis Indians	Parkway Field	
42	September 12, 1946 (Note: Game Three of the American Association championship first-round playoffs)	Tom Sunkel	St. Paul Saints	3–0	Louisville Colonels	Parkway Field	
43	June 26, 1947	Carl DeRose^{†}	Kansas City Blues	5–0	Minneapolis Millers	Municipal Stadium	
44	June 10, 1948	Monte Kennedy	Minneapolis Millers	14–0	Louisville Colonels	Nicollet Park	
45	August 1, 1948	Buck Ross	Toledo Mud Hens	1–0 (7)	Minneapolis Millers	Swayne Field	
46	September 8, 1948	Pat McGlothin	St. Paul Saints	7–0 (7)	Milwaukee Brewers	Lexington Park	
47	August 4, 1949	Walt Nothe	Toledo Mud Hens	2–0 (8) (Note: Scheduled for seven innings as the first game of a doubleheader, the game went to extra innings.)	Minneapolis Millers	Swayne Field	
48	September 6, 1949	Bill Connelly	Toledo Mud Hens	5–0	Louisville Colonels	Swayne Field	
49	June 27, 1950	Marlin Stuart^{†}	Toledo Mud Hens	1–0	Indianapolis Indians	Swayne Field	
50	July 27, 1950	Kirby Higbe	Minneapolis Millers	3–1 (7) (Note: Columbus scored a run after Solly Hemus walked, stole second base, advanced to third on a throwing error, and came home on a wild pitch in the first inning.)	Columbus Red Birds	Red Bird Stadium	
51	July 29, 1950	Bob Alexander	Louisville Colonels	5–0	Milwaukee Brewers	Parkway Field	
52	August 10, 1950	Dixie Howell	Minneapolis Millers	6–0	Columbus Red Birds	Nicollet Park	
53	August 16, 1951	Bert Thiel	Milwaukee Brewers	5–0 (7)	Toledo Mud Hens	Borchert Field	
54	September 7, 1952	Ernie Nevel	Kansas City Blues	3–0 (7)	Minneapolis Millers	Municipal Stadium	
55	August 20, 1954	Ray Crone	Toledo Mud Hens	3–0 (7)	St. Paul Saints	Lexington Park	
56	April 16, 1957	Stu Miller	Minneapolis Millers	1–0 (6) (Note: The game was called due to rain after six innings.)	Indianapolis Indians	Victory Field	
57	June 23, 1957	Ryne Duren	Denver Bears	3–0 (7)	Louisville Colonels	Bears Stadium	
58	May 22, 1958	Carl Willey	Wichita Braves	6–0	Louisville Colonels	Lawrence Stadium	
59	August 4, 1958	Frank Barnes	Omaha Cardinals	3–0	Louisville Colonels	Fairgrounds Stadium	
60	June 16, 1959	Juan Pizarro	Louisville Colonels	1–0	Charleston Senators	Fairgrounds Stadium	
61	July 24, 1959	Gary Peters	Indianapolis Indians	5–0	Minneapolis Millers	Victory Field	
62	May 24, 1960	Ralph Lumenti	Charleston Senators	2–0 (6) (Note: The game was called due to rain after six innings.)	Louisville Colonels	Watt Powell Park	
63	May 30, 1960	Howie Koplitz	Louisville Colonels	2–0 (7)	Indianapolis Indians	Fairgrounds Stadium	
64	May 8, 1969	Scipio Spinks	Oklahoma City 89ers	1–2 (7) (Note: Omaha scored two runs in the second inning. Paul Schaal walked, advanced to second base on a wild pickoff throw, and moved up to third on a wild pitch. After Fred Rico and another player walked, loading the bases, Rico came home on a wild pitch, and Schall scored on a dropped third strike.)	Omaha Royals	All Sports Stadium	
65	July 4, 1970	Milt Wilcox	Indianapolis Indians	2–0 (7)	Evansville Triplets	Bush Stadium	
66	June 5, 1971	Fred Norman	Tulsa Oilers	4–0	Indianapolis Indians	Oiler Park	
67	August 19, 1971	Rich Hand	Wichita Aeros	3–0	Tulsa Oilers	Oiler Park	
68	August 3, 1972	Jim Slaton	Evansville Triplets	5–0	Wichita Aeros	Lawrence Stadium	
69	August 25, 1972	Tom Murphy	Omaha Royals	7–0	Indianapolis Indians	Johnny Rosenblatt Stadium	
70	September 2, 1972	Oscar Zamora^{†}	Oklahoma City 89ers	5–0 (7)	Denver Bears	All Sports Stadium	
71	May 25, 1973	Bob Forsch	Tulsa Oilers	5–0	Denver Bears	Mile High Stadium	
72	May 24, 1974	Tom Carroll	Indianapolis Indians	2–0	Omaha Royals	Johnny Rosenblatt Stadium	
73	July 31, 1974	Joe Henderson	Iowa Oaks	10–0	Wichita Aeros	Lawrence Stadium	
74	August 25, 1974	Butch Stinson	Iowa Oaks	7–0	Indianapolis Indians	Bush Stadium	
75	June 2, 1976	Dave Hasbach	Omaha Royals	4–0 (7)	Tulsa Oilers	Oiler Park	
76	June 13, 1976	Chris Knapp (1)	Iowa Oaks	3–0 (7)	Evansville Triplets	Bosse Field	
77	July 15, 1976	Ed Glynn	Evansville Triplets	3–0 (7)	Iowa Oaks	Sec Taylor Stadium	
78	September 1, 1977	Chris Knapp (4 IP) (2) Fred Howard (5 IP)	Iowa Oaks	8–0	Omaha Royals	Johnny Rosenblatt Stadium	
79	May 26, 1978	Jack Kucek	Iowa Oaks	6–1 (Note: Oklahoma City scored a run after Cleo Smith walked and came home following the next three batters also walking in the first inning.)	Oklahoma City 89ers	Sec Taylor Stadium	
80	May 26, 1978	Silvio Martínez	Springfield Redbirds	4–0	Omaha Royals	Johnny Rosenblatt Stadium	
81	July 14, 1979	Jamie Easterly^{†}	Denver Bears	10–0 (7)	Iowa Oaks	Sec Taylor Stadium	
82	August 29, 1979	Paul Moskau (3 IP) Dave May (3 IP) Sheldon Burnside (2 IP) Ángel Torres (1 IP)	Indianapolis Indians	5–0	Evansville Triplets	Bosse Field	
83	August 17, 1980	Robert Madden (1 2/3 IP) Mark Lemongello (7 1/3 IP)	Wichita Aeros	5–2 (Note: Iowa scored two runs in the second inning. Chris Nyman and Marv Foley walked back-to-back. Nyman came home on a throwing error. Following another player being hit by a pitch, Foley came home on a sacrifice fly.)	Iowa Oaks	Sec Taylor Stadium	
84	April 27, 1981	Mike Jones	Omaha Royals	2–0	Iowa Oaks	Johnny Rosenblatt Stadium	
85	August 19, 1981	Larry Pashnick	Evansville Triplets	1–0	Iowa Oaks	Bosse Field	
86	July 31, 1984	Tom Browning	Wichita Aeros	2–0 (7)	Iowa Cubs	Sec Taylor Stadium	
87	August 21, 1984	Reggie Patterson	Iowa Cubs	2–0	Omaha Royals	Sec Taylor Stadium	
88	July 17, 1985	Bryan Kelly	Nashville Sounds	6–0	Oklahoma City 89ers	Herschel Greer Stadium	
89	August 27, 1985	Richard Stoll	Indianapolis Indians	3–0 (7)	Buffalo Bisons	Bush Stadium	
90	June 20, 1988	Luis Aquino	Omaha Royals	2–0	Columbus Clippers (Note: This was an interleague game played against an International League opponent as part of the Triple-A Alliance.)	Johnny Rosenblatt Stadium	
91	August 6, 1988	Randy Johnson (7 IP) Pat Pacillo (1 IP)	Indianapolis Indians	0–1 (Note: Nashville scored a run after Lenny Harris walked, stole second base, stole third, and came home on a ground out in the first inning.)	Nashville Sounds	Herschel Greer Stadium	
92	August 7, 1988	Jack Armstrong	Nashville Sounds	4–0	Indianapolis Indians	Herschel Greer Stadium	
93	July 13, 1990	Gene Walter	Omaha Royals	3–0 (7)	Iowa Cubs	Sec Taylor Stadium	
94	April 17, 1991	Roger Pavlik (5 1/3 IP) Steve Peters (2 2/3 IP)	Oklahoma City 89ers	0–1 (Note: Indianapolis scored a run after John Vander Wal walked and came home after the next three batters also walked in the sixth inning.)	Indianapolis Indians	Bush Stadium	
95	August 12, 1994	Scott Taylor	New Orleans Zephyrs	6–0	Buffalo Bisons	Privateer Park	
96	August 13, 1996	Rick Helling^{†}	Oklahoma City 89ers	4–0	Nashville Sounds	All Sports Stadium	
97	June 20, 1997	Bartolo Colón	Buffalo Bisons	4–0	New Orleans Zephyrs	North AmeriCare Park	

== No-hitters by team ==
Team	No-hitters	Perfect games
Toledo Mud Hens	10	1
Indianapolis Indians	10	0
Kansas City Blues	8	1
Louisville Colonels	8	0
St. Paul Saints (St. Paul Apostles)	8	0
Minneapolis Millers	7	1
Charleston Senators	6	0
Iowa Cubs (Iowa Oaks)	6	0
Milwaukee Brewers	6	0
Omaha Royals	5	0
Oklahoma City 89ers	4	2
Evansville Triplets	3	0
Wichita Aeros	3	0
Denver Bears	2	1
Columbus Redbirds	2	0
Nashville Sounds	2	0
Tulsa Oilers	2	0
Buffalo Bisons	1	0
New Orleans Zephyrs	1	0
Omaha Cardinals	1	0
Springfield Redbirds	1	0
Wichita Braves	1	0
Totals	97	6

== See also ==
- List of International League no-hitters
- List of Pacific Coast League no-hitters
