= Triple-A National Championship Game =

Annual minor league baseball game

- Frequency: Annual
- Location: Varies (see prose)
- Inaugurated: September 19, 2006 (AT&T Bricktown Ballpark, Oklahoma City, Oklahoma, United States)
- Most recent: September 26, 2026 (Las Vegas Ballpark, Summerlin, Nevada, United States)
- Next event: TBD
- Participants: League champions of the two Triple-A baseball leagues
- Organizer: Minor League Baseball

The Triple-A National Championship Game is a single interleague postseason baseball game between the league champions of the two affiliated Triple-A leagues of Minor League Baseball (MiLB)—the International League (IL) and Pacific Coast League (PCL)—to determine an overall champion of the classification. With the exceptions of 2020 and 2021, the game has been held at the end of each season since 2006.

The event was originally known as the Bricktown Showdown from 2006 to 2008, when it was held annually at AT&T Bricktown Ballpark in Oklahoma City, Oklahoma. It was renamed in 2009, but continued to be held in Oklahoma City. From 2011 to 2019, it was contested in a different Triple-A city each year. The 2020 game was cancelled along with the entire minor league season due to the COVID-19 pandemic, which contributed to the lack of a 2021 championship game. Since 2022, the event has been held at Las Vegas Ballpark in Summerlin, Nevada.

The Sacramento River Cats and Durham Bulls have each won three championships. The Columbus Clippers and Omaha Storm Chasers have each won two titles. Eight other teams have won one championship each. Eleven titles have been won by PCL teams, while the IL has won eight titles.

== History ==
=== Previous postseason series ===
Periodically from 1904 to 1975, the champions from the top-classification leagues of Minor League Baseball met in the postseason to determine a champion amongst them. The Little World Series (1904–1931) and Junior World Series (1932–1975) usually consisted of a best-of-seven (or eight) series modeled on the World Series of Major League Baseball. Most often, it was held between the champions of the International League (IL) and the American Association (AA). A one-time Triple-A World Series was held in 1983 as a round-robin tournament featuring the champions of the AA, IL, and Pacific Coast League (PCL). The AA and IL champions met in the Triple-A Classic, a best-of-seven series played from 1988 to 1991 in conjunction with the Triple-A Alliance. From 1998 to 2000, the Triple-A World Series was revived as a best-of-five championship series between the IL and PCL champions. The Triple-A World Series was discontinued because of poor attendance.

=== Bricktown Showdown (2006–2008) ===
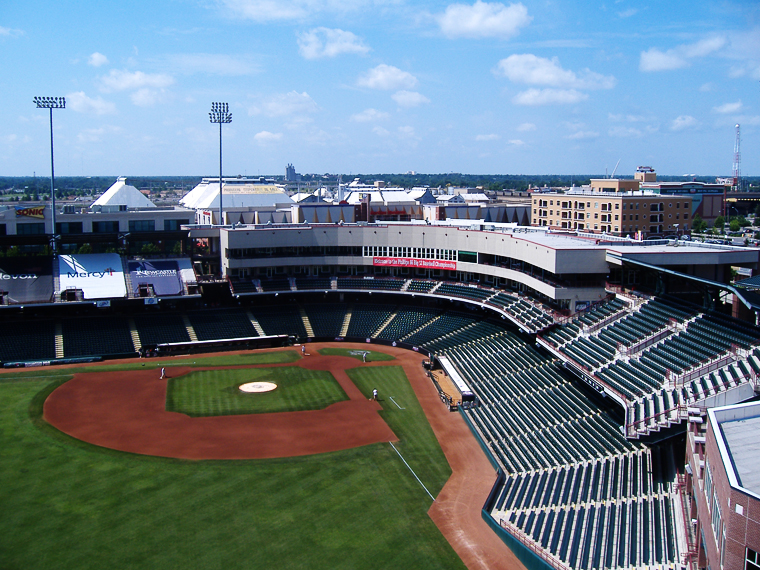
AT&T Bricktown Ballpark in Oklahoma City, Oklahoma, was the site of the first five championship games (2006–2010).

In 2006, Triple-A Baseball announced the creation of a single championship game between the league champions of the International League and Pacific Coast League to determine an overall champion of the classification. The game, called the Bricktown Showdown, was to be played at AT&T Bricktown Ballpark in Oklahoma City, Oklahoma, home of the PCL's Oklahoma RedHawks, following each league's postseason playoffs to determine their league champions. In addition to serving as the pinnacle of the Triple-A and MiLB season, the leagues sought for the championship game to develop and prosper like the Triple-A All-Star Game did since its creation in 1988.

The first Bricktown Showdown was played on September 19, 2006, between the IL-champion Toledo Mud Hens and the PCL-champion Tucson Sidewinders. In front of an announced paid attendance of 12,572 people and a national television audience watching on ESPN2, Tucson defeated Toledo, 5–2. Tucson left fielder Scott Hairston won the game's first Most Valuable Player Award after going 2-for-4 at the plate with 1 run batted in. The game was approved only as a one-time meeting by Major League Baseball, but subsequent meetings were planned for 2007 and 2008 following the success of the initial event. The next two editions, however, experienced successively lower attendances (11,124 in 2007 and 8,213 in 2008).

=== Triple-A National Championship Game (2009–present) ===
The Bricktown Showdown was rebranded as the Triple-A Baseball National Championship Game in 2009, and later to simply the Triple-A National Championship Game, to increase the event's national appeal and to emphasize its significance as a championship game. It continued to be held in Oklahoma City, but as attendance continued to diminish (6,777 in 2009 and 7,525 in 2010), the 2010 Triple-A championship was the last game to be decided at Bricktown Park.

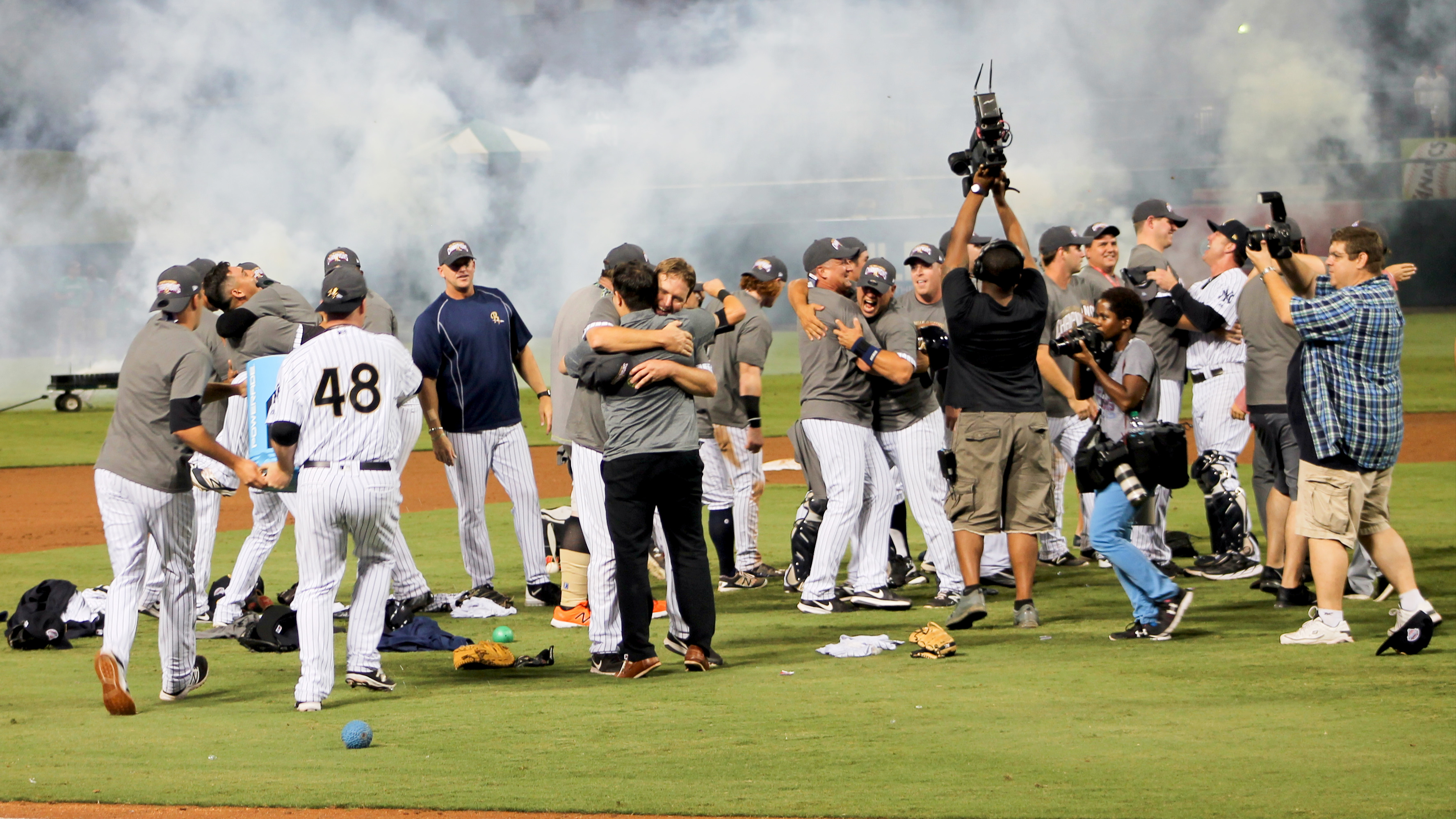
The Scranton/Wilkes-Barre RailRiders celebrating on the field after winning the 2016 Triple-A Championship

From 2011 to 2019, the game was held in different Triple-A cities each year. The first city to host under this new format was Albuquerque, New Mexico, home of the PCL's Albuquerque Isotopes, who played at Isotopes Park. The 2012 edition was held at Durham Bulls Athletic Park in Durham, North Carolina, home to the IL's Durham Bulls. It continued to alternate host sites thereafter, similar to the Triple-A All-Star Game, but with two consecutive years of PCL hosts followed by two years of IL hosts. No host city had its team qualify for the championship game during this period.

The start of the 2020 season was postponed due to the COVID-19 pandemic before ultimately being cancelled on June 30. This resulted in the cancellation of the 2020 game, which had been slated for Las Vegas Ballpark in Summerlin, Nevada, home of the PCL's Las Vegas Aviators. In conjunction with Major League Baseball's restructuring of Minor League Baseball in 2021, the IL and PCL disbanded, and Triple-A teams were reorganized into the Triple-A East and Triple-A West. Opening Day for the 2021 season was postponed for nearly a month to temporarily eliminate commercial air travel and give players the opportunity to be vaccinated against COVID-19 before the season started. The schedule did not include a postseason for league championship playoffs or the Triple-A National Championship Game. Instead, 10 games that had been postponed from the start of the season were reinserted into the schedule as a postseason tournament called the Triple-A Final Stretch, in which all 30 Triple-A clubs competed for the highest winning percentage.

In 2022, the Triple-A East and West were renamed the International League and Pacific Coast League, respectively, and they carried on the history of those leagues prior to reorganization. The 2022 game was the culmination of a three-day event called the Triple-A Triple Championship Weekend, in which league champions of the IL and PCL were determined on the first two days, and the Triple-A National Champion was crowned on the last. On September 30, the two division winners from the PCL competed for their league championship. The two IL division winners did the same on October 1. The league champions determined on those days competed for the Triple-A National Championship on October 2. The event was held at Summerlin's Las Vegas Ballpark.

Since 2023, each Triple-A league operates under a split season format with the winners of each half meeting in best-of-three series to determine their league champions. The winners then meet in Las Vegas to determine a Triple-A champion.

== Structure ==
The game itself consists of a single nine-inning game to determine a champion. The only championship game to go beyond the prescribed nine innings has been the 2009 contest, which went to eleven innings. From 2006 to 2016, the league that won the Triple-A All-Star Game earned the distinction of having its team designated as the home team. This changed in 2017, when home team status began being awarded to the team from the hosting league. Designated hitters bat in place of pitchers.

The game is staffed by a four-umpire crew, with one umpire behind home plate and the others covering each base. Two of the umpires work in the IL, while two work in the PCL. Positions rotate each year, such that IL umpires are assigned to home plate and second base in odd years, and PCL umpires cover those positions in even years.

== Results ==
Key
†	Indicates home team

Results
Date	Winning team (MLB affiliation)	League	Score	Losing team (MLB affiliation)	League	Ballpark (league)	Attendance	Ref.
September 19, 2006	Tucson Sidewinders (ARI)	PCL	5–2	Toledo Mud Hens^{†} (DET)	IL	AT&T Bricktown Ballpark (PCL)	12,572	
September 18, 2007	Sacramento River Cats (OAK)	PCL	7–1	Richmond Braves^{†} (ATL)	IL	AT&T Bricktown Ballpark (PCL)	11,124	
September 16, 2008	Sacramento River Cats^{†} (OAK)	PCL	4–1	Scranton/Wilkes-Barre Yankees (NYY)	IL	AT&T Bricktown Ballpark (PCL)	8,213	
September 22, 2009	Durham Bulls^{†} (TBR)	IL	5–4 (11 inn.)	Memphis Redbirds (STL)	PCL	AT&T Bricktown Ballpark (PCL)	6,777	
September 21, 2010	Columbus Clippers^{†} (CLE)	IL	12–6	Tacoma Rainiers (SEA)	PCL	AT&T Bricktown Ballpark (PCL)	7,525	
September 20, 2011	Columbus Clippers^{†} (CLE)	IL	8–3	Omaha Storm Chasers (KCR)	PCL	Isotopes Park (PCL)	9,569	
September 18, 2012	Reno Aces^{†} (ARI)	PCL	10–3	Pawtucket Red Sox (BOS)	IL	Durham Bulls Athletic Park (IL)	8,601	
September 17, 2013	Omaha Storm Chasers (KCR)	PCL	2–1	Durham Bulls^{†} (TBR)	IL	Coca-Cola Park (IL)	9,602	
September 16, 2014	Omaha Storm Chasers (KCR)	PCL	4–2	Pawtucket Red Sox^{†} (BOS)	IL	BB&T Ballpark (IL)	8,886	
September 22, 2015	Fresno Grizzlies (HOU)	PCL	7–0	Columbus Clippers^{†} (CLE)	IL	Southwest University Park (PCL)	9,332	
September 20, 2016	Scranton/Wilkes-Barre RailRiders^{†} (NYY)	IL	3–1	El Paso Chihuahuas (SDP)	PCL	AutoZone Park (PCL)	9,471	
September 19, 2017	Durham Bulls^{†} (TBR)	IL	5–3	Memphis Redbirds (STL)	PCL	PNC Field (IL)	9,383	
September 18, 2018	Memphis Redbirds (STL)	PCL	14–4	Durham Bulls^{†} (TBR)	IL	Huntington Park (IL)	9,183	
September 17, 2019	Sacramento River Cats^{†} (SFG)	PCL	4–0	Columbus Clippers (CLE)	IL	AutoZone Park (PCL)	9,123	
September 22, 2020	Cancelled due to the COVID-19 pandemic					Las Vegas Ballpark (PCL)	—	
2021	Not held							
October 2, 2022	Durham Bulls (TBR)	IL	10–6	Reno Aces^{†} (ARI)	PCL	Las Vegas Ballpark (PCL)	6,497	
September 30, 2023	Norfolk Tides (BAL)	IL	7–6	Oklahoma City Dodgers^{†} (LAD)	PCL	Las Vegas Ballpark (PCL)	8,556	
September 28, 2024	Sugar Land Space Cowboys^{†} (HOU)	PCL	13–6	Omaha Storm Chasers (ΚCR)	IL	Las Vegas Ballpark (PCL)	8,007	
September 27, 2025	Jacksonville Jumbo Shrimp^{†} (MIA)	IL	8–7	Las Vegas Aviators (ATH)	PCL	Las Vegas Ballpark (PCL)	10,129	
September 26, 2026	Oklahoma City Comets (LAD)	PCL	5–3 (10 inn.)	Rochester Red Wings^{†} (WSH)	IL	Las Vegas Ballpark (PCL)	7,210	

== Most Valuable Player Award ==
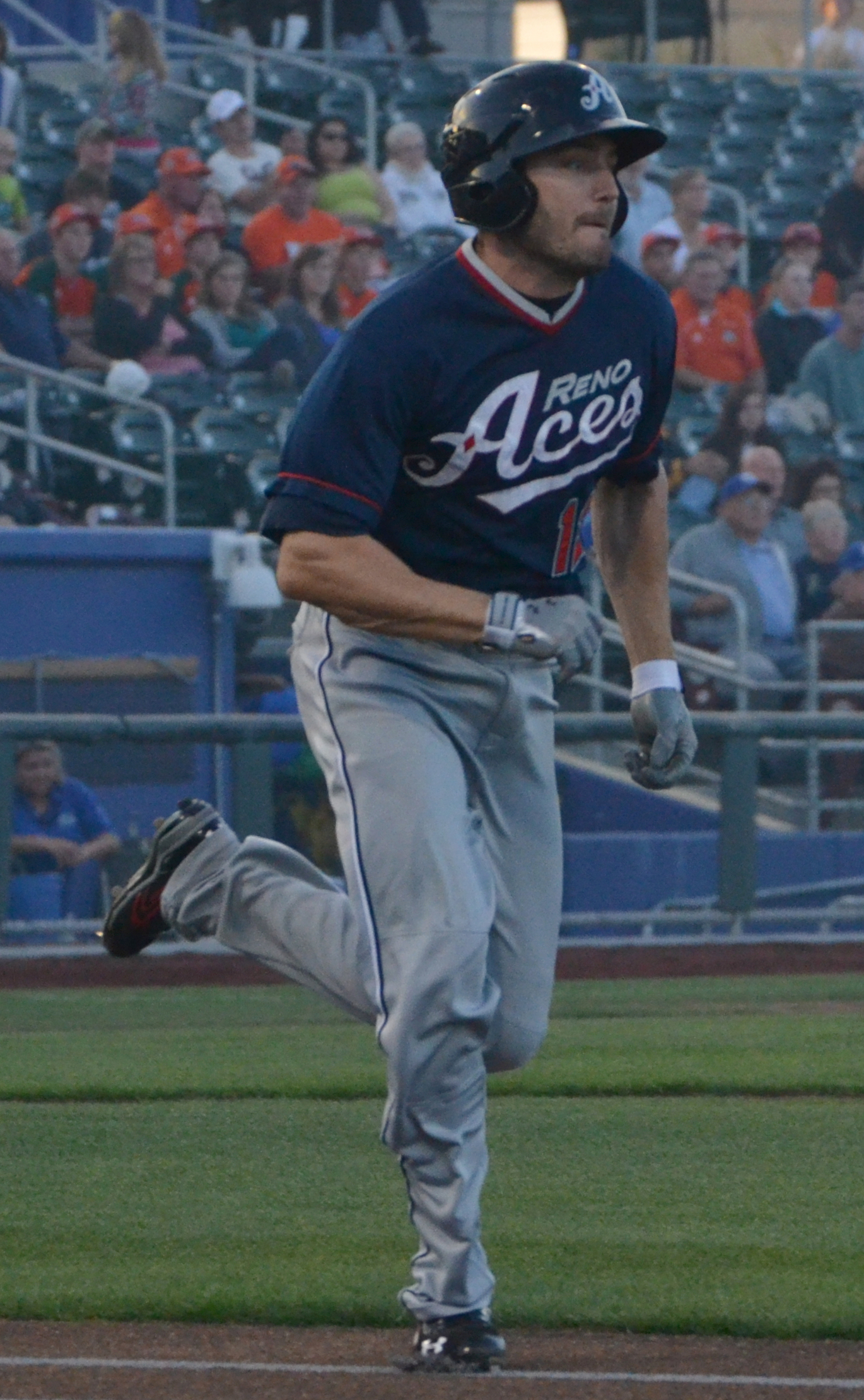
Center fielder A. J. Pollock of the Reno Aces was selected as the game's MVP in 2012.

One player from the winning team is recognized for their outstanding play in the game and is given the Most Valuable Player (MVP) Award.

Year	Player	Team (MLB affiliation)	League	Position	Ref.
2006	Scott Hairston	Tucson Sidewinders (ARI)	PCL	Left fielder	
2007	Lou Merloni	Sacramento River Cats (OAK)	PCL	Third baseman	
2008	Chris Gissell	Sacramento River Cats (OAK)	PCL	Relief pitcher	
2009	Jeremy Hellickson	Durham Bulls (TBR)	IL	Starting pitcher	
2010	Jerad Head	Columbus Clippers (CLE)	IL	Left fielder	
2011	Joe Martinez	Columbus Clippers (CLE)	IL	Starting pitcher	
2012	A. J. Pollock	Reno Aces (ARI)	PCL	Center fielder	
2013	Chris Dwyer	Omaha Storm Chasers (KCR)	PCL	Starting pitcher	
2014	Brett Hayes	Omaha Storm Chasers (KCR)	PCL	Catcher	
2015	Chris Devenski	Fresno Grizzlies (HOU)	PCL	Starting pitcher	
2016	Chris Parmelee	Scranton/Wilkes-Barre RailRiders (NYY)	IL	First baseman	
2017	Kean Wong	Durham Bulls (TBR)	IL	Second baseman	
2018	Alex Mejia	Memphis Redbirds (STL)	PCL	First baseman	
2019	Caleb Baragar	Sacramento River Cats (SFG)	PCL	Starting pitcher	
2020	None selected (Game cancelled due to the COVID-19 pandemic)				
2021	None selected (Game not held)				
2022	Bligh Madris	Durham Bulls (TBR)	IL	Left fielder	
2023	Colton Cowser	Norfolk Tides (BAL)	IL	Center fielder	
2024	Shay Whitcomb	Sugar Land Space Cowboys (HOU)	PCL	Designated hitter	
2025	Jacob Berry	Jacksonville Jumbo Shrimp (MIA)	IL	Right fielder	
2026	Alek Thomas	Oklahoma City Comets (LAD)	PCL	Center fielder	

== Appearances by team ==
Active Triple-A teams appear in bold.

Apps.	Team	League	Wins	Losses	Win %	Most recent win	Most recent appearance
5	**Durham Bulls**	IL	3	2	.600	2022	2022
4	**Columbus Clippers**	IL	2	2	.500	2011	2019
4	**Omaha Storm Chasers**	PCL/IL	2	2	.500	2014	2024
3	**Sacramento River Cats**	PCL	3	0	1.000	2019	2019
3	**Memphis Redbirds**	PCL	1	2	.333	2018	2018
2	**Oklahoma City Comets** (Oklahoma City Dodgers)	PCL	1	1	.500	2026	2026
2	**Reno Aces**	PCL	1	1	.500	2012	2022
2	**Scranton/Wilkes-Barre Highlanders** (Scranton/Wilkes-Barre Yankees/RailRiders)	IL	1	1	.500	2016	2016
2	Pawtucket Red Sox	IL	0	2	.000	—	2014
1	Fresno Grizzlies	PCL	1	0	1.000	2015	2015
1	**Jacksonville Jumbo Shrimp**	IL	1	0	1.000	2025	2025
1	**Norfolk Tides**	IL	1	0	1.000	2023	2023
1	**Sugar Land Space Cowboys**	PCL	1	0	1.000	2024	2024
1	Tucson Sidewinders	PCL	1	0	1.000	2006	2006
1	**El Paso Chihuahuas**	PCL	0	1	.000	—	2016
1	**Las Vegas Aviators**	PCL	0	1	.000	—	2025
1	Richmond Braves	IL	0	1	.000	—	2007
1	**Rochester Red Wings**	IL	0	1	.000	—	2026
1	**Tacoma Rainiers**	PCL	0	1	.000	—	2010
1	**Toledo Mud Hens**	IL	0	1	.000	—	2006

== Broadcasts ==
The event has been televised nationally every year. It aired on ESPN2 from 2006 to 2009, on Verus from 2010 to 2011, and on NBC Sports Network from 2012 to 2018. The game aired on Fox Sports in 2019. Since 2022, the game has been televised on MLB Network.

== See also ==
- Triple-A baseball awards
