= Triple-A World Series =

Postseason Minor League Baseball series

- Status: Defunct
- Location: Varies (see prose)
- Years active: 4
- Inaugurated: Sept 15–19, 1983 (Cardinal Stadium, Louisville, Kentucky, United States)
- Most recent: Sept 18–21, 2000 (Cashman Field, Las Vegas, Nevada, United States)
- Participants: League champions of the Triple-A baseball leagues
- Organizer: Minor League Baseball

The Triple-A World Series was an interleague postseason championship series between the league champions of the affiliated Triple-A leagues of Minor League Baseball to determine an overall champion of the classification held in 1983 and from 1998 to 2000.

The 1983 Triple-A World Series was held as a round-robin tournament involving the champions of the American Association (AA), International League (IL), and Pacific Coast League (PCL) at Cardinal Stadium in Louisville, Kentucky. A combination of low attendance and the three league presidents being unable to agree on a more suitable location resulted in the cancellation of a proposed 1984 series. Following the disbandment of the AA after the 1997 season, the Triple-A World Series was revived as a contest between the IL and PCL from 1998 to 2000. Held at Cashman Field in Las Vegas, Nevada, the series was discontinued after three years of poor attendance.

Two of the four Triple-A World Series were won by International League teams, and two were won by Pacific Coast League teams. The Tidewater Tides (IL) won the initial 1983 series. The New Orleans Zephyrs (PCL) won in 1998, and the Vancouver Canadians (PCL) won in 1999. The Indianapolis Indians (IL) won the final series in 2000.

== History ==
=== Previous postseason series ===
Periodically from 1904 to 1975, the champions from the top-classification leagues of Minor League Baseball met in the postseason to determine a champion amongst them. The Little World Series (1904–1931) and Junior World Series (1932–1975) usually consisted of a best-of-seven (or eight) series modeled on the World Series of Major League Baseball. Most often, it was held between the champions of the International League (IL) and the American Association (AA), though the Pacific Coast League (PCL) participated in place of the IL in 1919. Officials from the International League voted to discontinue the series after 1975 due to their playoff teams being weakened by major league call-ups, the unavailability of some stadiums late in the year, high travel expenses, and low attendance, which led to low revenue for team owners.

=== Triple-A World Series (1983) ===
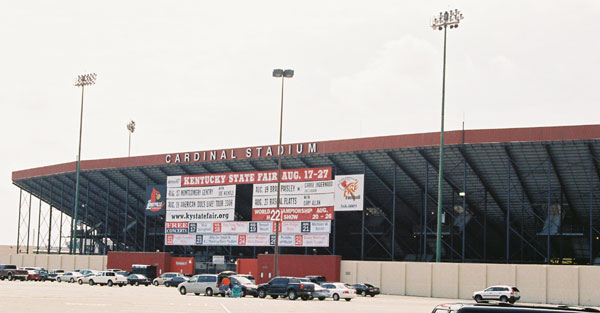
The 1983 Triple-A World Series was held at Cardinal Stadium in Louisville, Kentucky.

During the 1981 Major League Baseball strike, International League president Harold Cooper conceived the idea of a Triple-A World Series when television stations broadcast Triple-A games in the absence of major league games. In late 1982, Louisville Redbirds owner A. Ray Smith mentioned the idea to Columbus Clippers president George Sisler Jr. Cooper, Smith, Sisler, and American Association president Joe Ryan met that October to discuss plans for such a series. Under their proposal, the league champions of the American Association, International League, and Pacific Coast League would participate in a mulit-day round-robin tournament to determine a champion of the Triple-A classification. On October 28, representatives from all three leagues met to give final approval to the series.

Cardinal Stadium in Louisville, Kentucky, was selected as the site for the first Triple-A World Series because its Cardinals had set the all-time minor league attendance record that season. Through 65 games, total attendance was 1,052,438 people, for an average of over 16,000 per game. The series was to be televised on ESPN.

The 1983 Triple-A World Series was played from September 15–19. The total attendance for all four dates was 26,914 people, for an average of 6,728 per game. League officials believed something needed to be done to boost the series' popularity and attendance. They considered ensuring the home team's participation, playing the series before the Labor Day holiday, and moving to a new location. PCL president Bill Cutler proposed moving the series to Las Vegas for 1984. The IL supported this move, but the AA wanted to keep it in Louisville. Commissioner of Baseball Bowie Kuhn, who felt uneasy about playing games in Las Vegas due to the presence of legalized gambling, cancelled the series in April 1984 after the three Triple-A presidents could not come to an agreement as to its location. There was not another postseason meeting of these minor leagues until 1988, when the International League and the American Association held the first Triple-A Classic, a best-of-seven series played in conjunction with the Triple-A Alliance. The Triple-A Classic continued as an annual event until league owners voted to end the Triple-A Alliance after 1991.

=== Triple-A World Series in Las Vegas (1998–2000) ===
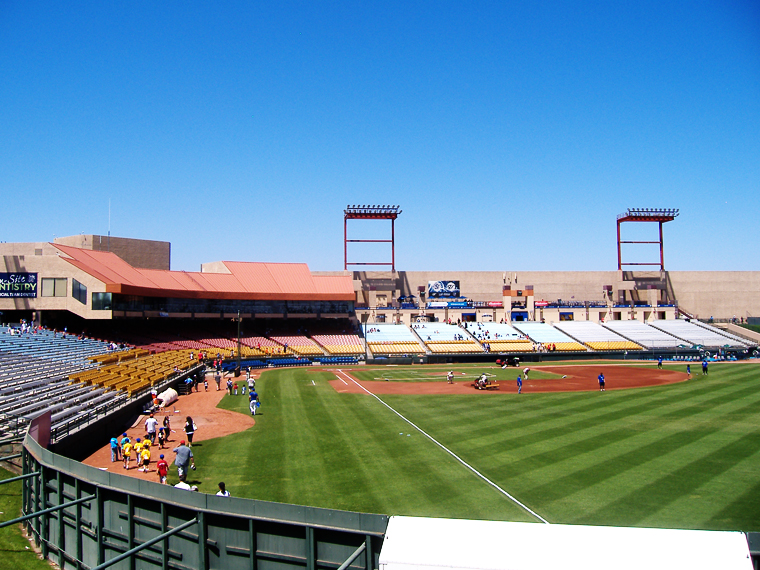
The Triple-A World Series was held at Cashman Field in Las Vegas, Nevada, from 1998 to 2000.

On July 9, 1997, Triple-A owners voted for a realignment plan that resulted in the American Association disbanding and its teams being absorbed by the International League and Pacific Coast League in 1998. A committee was established to explore the possibility of reviving the Triple-A World Series in a four-team IL-versus-PCL format involving either the champions and runners-up from each league or the incorporation of each league championship series into the series' semifinals. Plans were finalized before the start of the 1998 season. The IL and PCL champions would meet in a best-of-five series at Cashman Field in Las Vegas, home of the PCL's Las Vegas Stars. The agreement was joint venture between the two Triple-A leagues, Major League Baseball, and the Las Vegas Convention and Visitors Authority and was scheduled to run for three years, from 1998 to 2000. The site was chosen because of its reasonable travel costs and other offerings in the city. The series were to be televised on ESPN2.

The 1998 Triple-A World Series was played in four games from September 21–25. The average attendance was 3,368 people per game. Attendance at the 1999 series, played in five games from September 20–25, improved slightly to 4,002 per game. The average attendance at the four-game 2000 series, held from September 18–21, dropped to an all-time low of 2,311.

Before the 2000 Triple-A World Series, IL and PCL officials entered into negotiations with officials from Las Vegas about continuing the event beyond the original three-year deal. At the same time, they also explored other possible neutral sites for future games, including Doubleday Field in Cooperstown, New York, home of the National Baseball Hall of Fame and Museum, and Disney's Wide World of Sports Complex in Orlando, Florida. Another option was a home-and-home arrangement where games would be played at the home stadiums of each participant. An agreement to keep the event in Las Vegas was reached during the 2000 series, but the 2001 Triple-A World Series would be reduced to a best-of-three series held on a weekend rather than on weekdays. However, this decision was reversed months later when the leagues decided to suspend the series for 2001—citing poor attendance—and find a new format for 2002.

Ultimately, the Triple-A World Series was discontinued, and the International League and the Pacific Coast League returned to ending their seasons after the crowning of their own champions. No other postseason meetings between the leagues occurred until 2006 with the creation of the Bricktown Showdown, a single game to determine a champion of the Triple-A classification.

== Results ==
Key
| † | Indicates home team |

=== 1983 Triple-A World Series ===
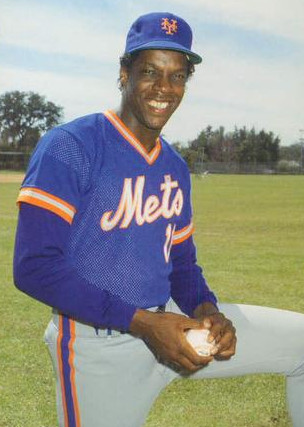
Dwight Gooden pitched a complete game in a 4–2 win by the Tidewater Tides over the Denver Bears in Game Four.

The Denver Bears qualified for the 1983 Triple-A World Series by defeating the Louisville Redbirds, 4–0, to win the American Association championship. The Tidewater Tides beat the Richmond Braves, 3–1, to win the International League championship and advance to the series. The Portland Beavers won the Pacific Coast League championship and a spot in the series by sweeping the Albuquerque Dukes, 3–0.

In Game One, Tidewater defeated Denver, 7–1, behind the pitching performances of Tim Leary and Terry Leach, who limited the Bears to one run, and the offense of Rusty Tillman, who led the scoring with three runs batted in (RBIs). In Game Two, played the next day as the first part of a nine-inning double header, Portland took a three-run lead in the first inning and never relinquished, winning 11–8 over Tidewater. Portland's Rick Schu and Steve Jeltz each came home to score three times, and Dick Davis and Tim Corcoran each drove in three runs. In Game Three, the nightcap, Portland beat Denver, 3–2.

On the third day of competition, the Tides' Dwight Gooden pitched a complete game four-hitter in Game Four as Tidewater defeated Denver, 4–2. In Game Five that evening, Tidewater downed Portland, 6–3, with help from Ron Gardenhire, who drove in three runs. Going into the last day of the series, Tidewater held a 3–1 lead after playing all four of their games. Portland, at 2–1, could force a playoff for the Triple-A World Series title with a win over Denver in Game Six. In a close back-and-forth contest, Denver defeated Portland, 5–4, with Marv Foley scoring twice and driving in two runs.

The Tidewater Tides (IL, 3–1) won the series against the Portland Beavers (PCL, 2–2) and Denver Bears (AA, 1–3). Tidewater first baseman Gary Rajsich was selected as the Triple-A World Series Most Valuable Player (MVP). Over the series, he accumulated a .583 batting average with 2 home runs and 5 RBIs.

1983 Triple-A World Series results
| Game | Date | Winning team (MLB affiliation) | League | Score | Losing team (MLB affiliation) | League | Attendance | Ref. |
|---|---|---|---|---|---|---|---|---|
| 1 | September 15 | Tidewater Tides (NYM) | IL | 7–1 | Denver Bears^{†} (CWS) | AA | 8,154 | |
| 2 | September 16 (1) | Portland Beavers (PHI) | PCL | 11–8 | Tidewater Tides^{†} (NYM) | IL | 7,234 | |
| 3 | September 16 (2) | Portland Beavers^{†} (PHI) | PCL | 3–2 | Denver Bears (CWS) | AA | 7,234 | |
| 4 | September 18 (1) | Tidewater Tides^{†} (NYM) | IL | 4–2 | Denver Bears (CWS) | AA | 6,344 | |
| 5 | September 18 (2) | Tidewater Tides (NYM) | IL | 6–3 | Portland Beavers^{†} (PHI) | PCL | 6,344 | |
| 6 | September 19 | Denver Bears^{†} (CWS) | AA | 5–4 | Portland Beavers (PHI) | PCL | 5,182 | |
Tidewater won the series, 3–1.

=== 1998 Triple-A World Series ===
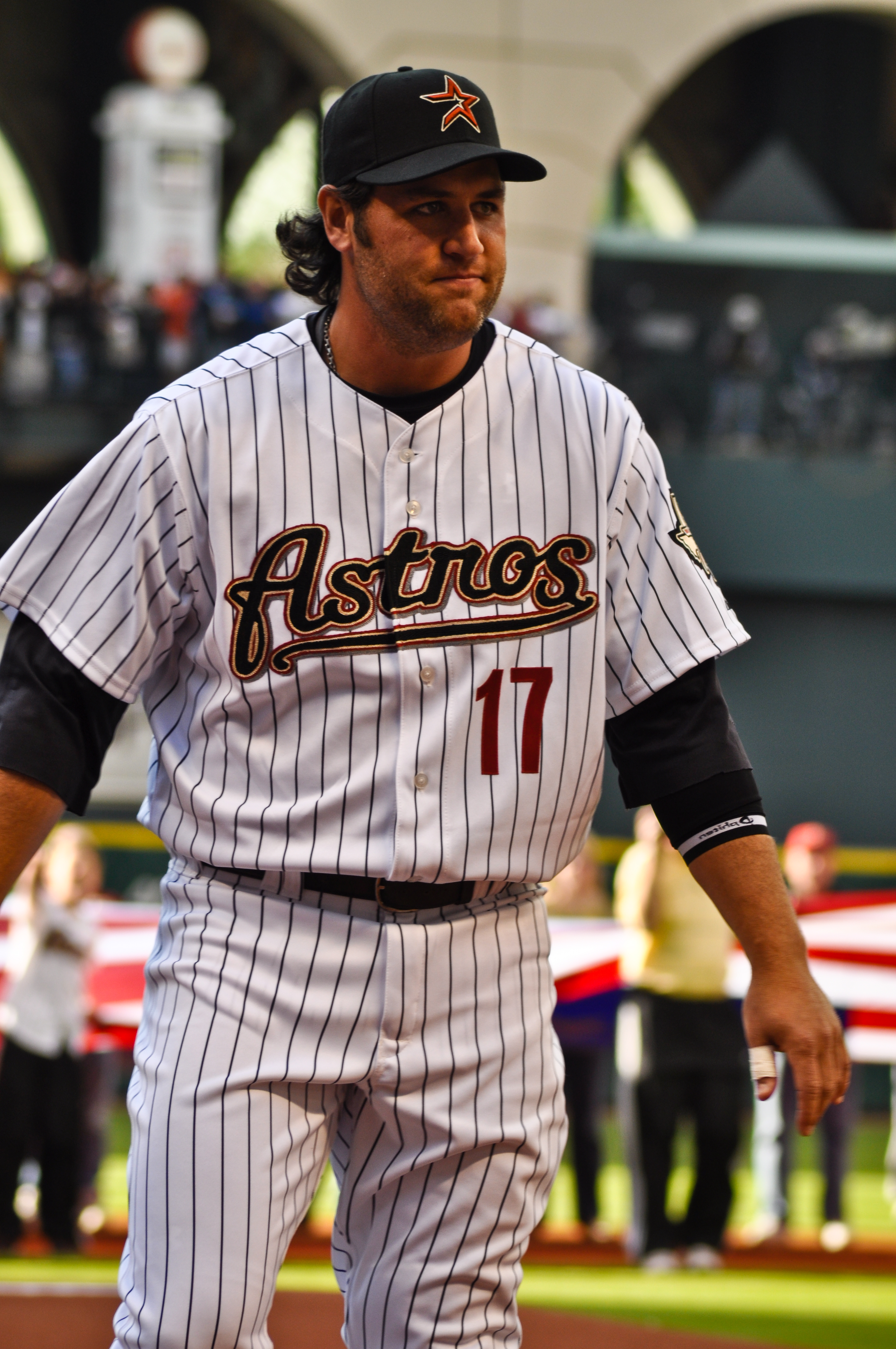
Lance Berkman was selected as the Most Valuable Player of the 1998 series.

The Buffalo Bisons qualified for the 1998 Las Vegas Triple-A World Series by winning the IL championship over the Durham Bulls, 3–2. The New Orleans Zephyrs won the PCL championship and a series berth by defeating the Calgary Cannons, 3–2.

In Game One, New Orleans won against Buffalo, 7–2. Zephyrs starting pitcher John Halama retired 19 of the first 21 Bisons batters he faced, and Daryle Ward scored the first four runs with two 2-run home runs. Buffalo evened the series with a 9–2 win in Game Two. James Betzold, Phil Hiatt, and Jeff Manto collected two RBIs each. In Game 3, New Orleans regained the series lead with a 3–2 win in which Ken Ramos and Marc Ronan hit back-to-back home runs in the bottom of the eighth inning putting the Zephyrs ahead. New Orleans won a decisive Game 4 behind the bat of Lance Berkman, who hit three home runs and drove in six, in the 12–6 victory. Berkman, a left fielder, was voted the series MVP after he hit .467 with 3 home runs and 6 RBIs.

1998 Triple-A World Series results
| Game | Date | Winning team (MLB affiliation) | League | Score | Losing team (MLB affiliation) | League | Attendance | Ref. |
|---|---|---|---|---|---|---|---|---|
| 1 | September 21 | New Orleans Zephyrs (HOU) | PCL | 7–2 | Buffalo Bisons (CLE) | IL | 4,142 | |
| 2 | September 22 | Buffalo Bisons (CLE) | IL | 9–2 | New Orleans Zephyrs (HOU) | PCL | 4,090 | |
| 3 | September 24 | New Orleans Zephyrs^{†} (HOU) | PCL | 3–2 | Buffalo Bisons (CLE) | IL | — | |
| 4 | September 25 | New Orleans Zephyrs (HOU) | PCL | 12–6 | Buffalo Bisons (CLE) | IL | 2,855 | |
New Orleans won the series, 3–1.

=== 1999 Triple-A World Series ===
The Charlotte Knights won the IL championship and advanced to the 1999 Triple-A World Series by defeating the Durham Bulls, 3–1. The Vancouver Canadians qualified for the series with a 3–1 PCL championship win over the Oklahoma RedHawks.

In Game One, Vancouver reached the middle of the seventh inning with a 5–1 lead behind starting pitcher Mark Mulder. Charlotte tied the game, 5–5, in the bottom of the eighth, and walked-off with a 6–5 win after Eric Christopherson drove in Chad Mottola in the bottom of the ninth with a slow infield hit. In Game Two, Vancouver tied the series with a 5–4 win, with Terrence Long driving home Mike Neill with a triple in the fifth inning for the winning run. In Game Three, the Knights' Jon Garland struck out eight Canadians, allowing no earned runs, and Jeff Abbott and Jeff Liefer each homered off of Vancouver's Barry Zito, in a 4–2 victory. Vancouver answered with a 9–7 win in Game Four in which Joe Espada drove in Eric Martins for the key run in the eighth to send the series to the full five games. Vancouver won Game 5 and the series with a 16–2 rout over Charlotte. Mulder pitched a complete game, allowing two runs on seven hits, and Long and Roberto Vaz led the scoring with three RBIs apiece. Center fielder Terrence Long, who hit .429 with 9 hits and 10 RBIs, was selected as the series MVP.

1999 Triple-A World Series results
| Game | Date | Winning team (MLB affiliation) | League | Score | Losing team (MLB affiliation) | League | Attendance | Ref. |
|---|---|---|---|---|---|---|---|---|
| 1 | September 20 | Charlotte Knights^{†} (CWS) | IL | 6–5 | Vancouver Canadians (OAK) | PCL | 5,092 | |
| 2 | September 21 | Vancouver Canadians^{†} (OAK) | PCL | 5–4 | Charlotte Knights (CWS) | IL | 5,590 | |
| 3 | September 23 | Charlotte Knights^{†} (CWS) | IL | 4–2 | Vancouver Canadians (OAK) | PCL | 3,910 | |
| 4 | September 24 | Vancouver Canadians^{†} (OAK) | PCL | 9–7 | Charlotte Knights (CWS) | IL | 3,132 | |
| 5 | September 25 | Vancouver Canadians (OAK) | PCL | 16–2 | Charlotte Knights^{†} (CWS) | IL | 2,284 | |
Vancouver won the series, 3–2.

=== 2000 Triple-A World Series ===
The Indianapolis Indians gained a berth in the 2000 Triple-A World Series by winning the IL championship over the Scranton/Wilkes-Barre Red Barons, 3–2. The Memphis Redbirds won the PCL championship and advanced to the series by defeating the Salt Lake Buzz, 3–1.

In Game One, Lyle Mouton led the Indianapolis offense with four RBIs and a three-run home run in the seventh inning on the way to an 8–3 Indians win. Both teams scored in the first inning of Game Two, and the score remained knotted at 1–1 until the bottom of the eighth when Indianapolis's Santiago Pérez drove in Chris Jones for a 2–1 lead. Bob Scanlan, the IL saves leader, came in the ninth to close the game. Memphis lead-off hitter Albert Pujols drew a walk and eventually scored the tieing run on Keith McDonald's base hit. Tied 2–2 in the bottom of the ninth, the Indians' Creighton Gubanich hit a walk-off home run to give Indianapolis a 3–2 win and a 2–0 series lead. Memphis staved off elimination with an 11-4 Game Three victory behind the bat of Larry Sutton, who hit two home runs. In Game Four, Indianapolis' Horacio Estrada allowed two runs in the first inning and then pitched seven scoreless frames before Scanlan came in to close out the game with the Indians winning, 9–2, and taking the series, 3–1. Shortstop Santiago Pérez, who hit .462 with 2 home runs, 3 RBIs, and 4 runs, was selected as the series MVP.

2000 Triple-A World Series results
| Game | Date | Winning team (MLB affiliation) | League | Score | Losing team (MLB affiliation) | League | Attendance | Ref. |
|---|---|---|---|---|---|---|---|---|
| 1 | September 18 | Indianapolis Indians (MIL) | IL | 8–3 | Memphis Redbirds^{†} (STL) | PCL | 1,939 | |
| 2 | September 19 | Indianapolis Indians^{†} (MIL) | IL | 3–2 | Memphis Redbirds (STL) | PCL | 3,202 | |
| 3 | September 20 | Memphis Redbirds^{†} (STL) | PCL | 11–4 | Indianapolis Indians (MIL) | IL | 2,103 | |
| 4 | September 21 | Indianapolis Indians^{†} (MIL) | IL | 9–2 | Memphis Redbirds (STL) | PCL | 1,999 | |
Indianapolis won the series, 3–1.

=== Overall ===
Two of the four Triple-A World Series were won by International League teams, and two were won by Pacific Coast League teams. The Tidewater Tides (IL) won the initial 1983 series. The New Orleans Zephyrs (PCL) won in 1998, and the Vancouver Canadians (PCL) won in 1999. The Indianapolis Indians (IL) won the final series in 2000. IL and PCL teams tied in the all-time series with two wins apiece. The only American Association team to participate lost in their only series appearance.

Overall Triple-A World Series results
| Year | Winning team (MLB affiliation) | League | Score | Losing team (MLB affiliation) | League | Ref. |
|---|---|---|---|---|---|---|
| 1983 | Tidewater Tides (NYM) | IL | 3–1 | Portland Beavers (PHI) (Note: Portland had a series record of 2–2.); Denver Bears (CWS) (Note: Denver had a series record of 1–3.) | PCL; AA | |
| 1998 | New Orleans Zephyrs (HOU) | PCL | 3–1 | Buffalo Bisons (CLE) | IL | |
| 1999 | Vancouver Canadians (OAK) | PCL | 3–2 | Charlotte Knights (CWS) | IL | |
| 2000 | Indianapolis Indians (MIL) | IL | 3–1 | Memphis Redbirds (STL) | PCL | |

== Most Valuable Player Award ==
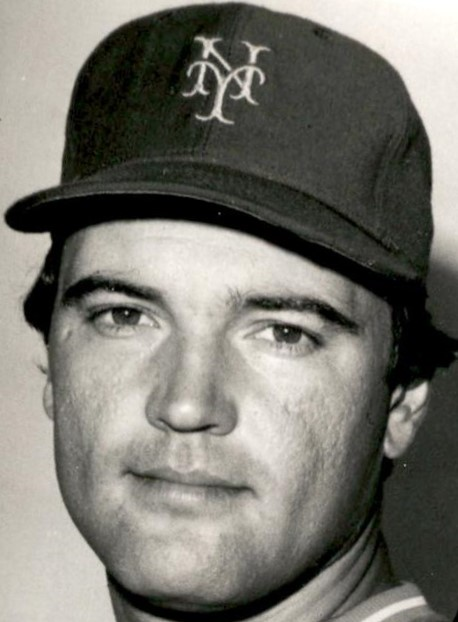
First baseman Gary Rajsich of the Tidewater Tides was selected as the MVP in 1983.

One player from the winning team was recognized for their outstanding play in the series and was given the Most Valuable Player (MVP) Award.

Most Valuable Player Award winners
| Year | Player | Team (MLB affiliation) | League | Position | Ref. |
|---|---|---|---|---|---|
| 1983 | Gary Rajsich | Tidewater Tides (NYM) | IL | First baseman | |
| 1998 | Lance Berkman | New Orleans Zephyrs (HOU) | PCL | Left fielder | |
| 1999 | Terrence Long | Vancouver Canadians (OAK) | PCL | Center fielder | |
| 2000 | Santiago Pérez | Indianapolis Indians (MIL) | IL | Shortstop | |

== See also ==
- Triple-A baseball awards
