= Junior World Series =

Professional baseball event in the United States

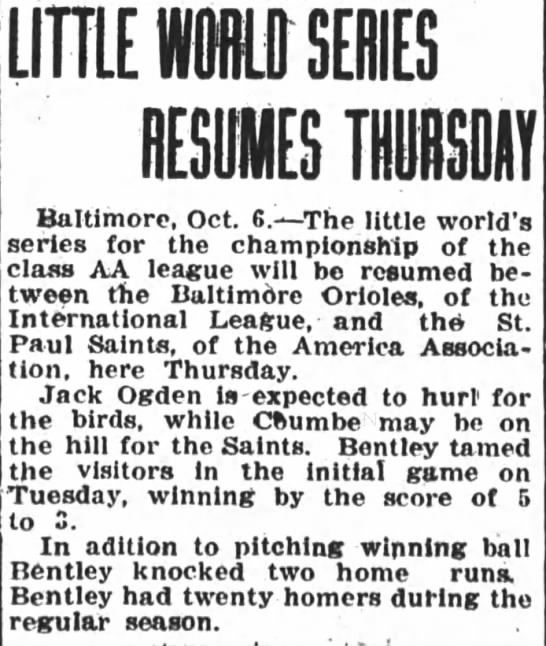
A newspaper article about the 1920 Little World Series

The Junior World Series was a postseason championship series between champions of two of the three highest minor league baseball leagues modeled on the World Series of Major League Baseball. It was called the Little World Series (no relation to the Little League World Series) until 1932, and acquired other official names at different times.

The various iterations of the Junior World Series were played for most of the years of the 20th century, off and on depending on the fortunes of the various leagues involved. Most often it was held between the champions of the International League (IL) and the American Association (AA). This left the third, and sometimes stronger, minor circuit called the Pacific Coast League (PCL) out of this minor league championship series. After not being held in 1972 and 1974, the last Junior World Series was held in 1975.

The Junior World Series was superseded by the Triple-A Classic, held from 1988 to 1991. Then, from 1998 to 2000, the Triple-A World Series pitted the IL and PCL champs against each other (as the AA had folded in 1997). The Triple-A Baseball National Championship Game was established in 2006.

== Little World Series ==
| Year | Winning team (MLB affiliation) | League | Score | Losing team (MLB affiliation) | League |
|---|---|---|---|---|---|
| 1904 | Buffalo Bisons (none) | IL | 2–1 | St. Paul Saints (none) | AA |
| 1906 | Buffalo Bisons (none) | IL | 3–2–1 | Columbus Senators (none) | AA |
| 1907 | Toronto Maple Leafs (none) | IL | 4–1 | Columbus Senators (none) | AA |
| 1917 | Indianapolis Indians (none) | AA | 4–1 | Toronto Maple Leafs (none) | IL |
| 1919^{[a]} | Vernon Tigers (none) | PCL | 5–4 | St. Paul Saints (none) | AA |
| 1920 | Baltimore Orioles (none) | IL | 5–1 | St. Paul Saints (none) | AA |
| 1921 | Louisville Colonels (none) | AA | 5–3 | Baltimore Orioles (none) | IL |
| 1922 | Baltimore Orioles (none) | IL | 5–2 | St. Paul Saints (none) | AA |
| 1923 | Kansas City Blues (none) | AA | 5–4 | Baltimore Orioles (none) | IL |
| 1924 | St. Paul Saints (none) | AA | 5–4–1 | Baltimore Orioles (none) | IL |
| 1925 | Baltimore Orioles (none) | IL | 5–3 | Louisville Colonels (none) | AA |
| 1926 | Toronto Maple Leafs (none) | IL | 5–0 | Louisville Colonels (none) | AA |
| 1927 | Toledo Mud Hens (none) | AA | 5–1 | Buffalo Bisons (none) | IL |
| 1928 | Indianapolis Indians (none) | AA | 5–1–1 | Rochester Red Wings (STL) | IL |
| 1929 | Kansas City Blues (none) | AA | 5–4 | Rochester Red Wings (STL) | IL |
| 1930 | Rochester Red Wings (STL) | IL | 5–3 | Louisville Colonels (none) | AA |
| 1931 | Rochester Red Wings (STL) | IL | 5–3 | St. Paul Saints (none) | AA |

== Junior World Series ==
| Year | Winning team (MLB affiliation) | League | Score | Losing team (MLB affiliation) | League |
|---|---|---|---|---|---|
| 1932 | Newark Bears (NYY) | IL | 4–2 | Minneapolis Millers (none) | AA |
| 1933 | Columbus Red Birds (STL) | AA | 5–3 | Buffalo Bisons (none) | IL |
| 1934 | Columbus Red Birds (STL) | AA | 5–4 | Toronto Maple Leafs (CIN) | IL |
| 1935 | No series held | | | | |
| 1936 | Milwaukee Brewers (none) | AA | 4–1 | Buffalo Bisons (none) | IL |
| 1937 | Newark Bears (NYY) | IL | 4–3 | Columbus Red Birds (STL) | AA |
| 1938 | Kansas City Blues (NYY) | AA | 4–3 | Newark Bears (NYY) | IL |
| 1939 | Louisville Colonels (BOS) | AA | 4–3 | Rochester Red Wings (STL) | IL |
| 1940 | Newark Bears (NYY) | IL | 4–2 | Louisville Colonels (BOS) | AA |
| 1941 | Columbus Red Birds (STL) | AA | 4–2 | Montreal Royals (BRO) | IL |
| 1942 | Columbus Red Birds (STL) | AA | 4–1 | Syracuse Chiefs (CIN) | IL |
| 1943 | Columbus Red Birds (STL) | AA | 4–1 | Syracuse Chiefs (CIN) | IL |
| 1944 | Baltimore Orioles (CLE) | IL | 4–2 | Louisville Colonels (BOS) | AA |
| 1945 | Louisville Colonels (BOS) | AA | 4–2 | Newark Bears (NYY) | IL |
| 1946 | Montreal Royals (BRO) | IL | 4–2 | Louisville Colonels (BOS) | AA |
| 1947 | Milwaukee Brewers (BSN) | AA | 4–3 | Syracuse Chiefs (CIN) | IL |
| 1948 | Montreal Royals (BRO) | IL | 4–1 | St. Paul Saints (BRO) | AA |
| 1949 | Indianapolis Indians (PIT) | AA | 4–2 | Montreal Royals (BRO) | IL |
| 1950 | Columbus Red Birds (STL) | AA | 4–2 | Baltimore Orioles (SLB) | IL |
| 1951 | Milwaukee Brewers (BSN) | AA | 4–2 | Montreal Royals (BRO) | IL |
| 1952 | Rochester Red Wings (STL) | IL | 4–3 | Kansas City Blues (NYY) | AA |
| 1953 | Montreal Royals (BRO) | IL | 4–1 | Kansas City Blues (NYY) | AA |
| 1954 | Louisville Colonels (BOS) | AA | 4–2 | Syracuse Chiefs (PHI) | IL |
| 1955 | Minneapolis Millers (NYG) | AA | 4–3 | Rochester Red Wings (STL) | IL |
| 1956 | Indianapolis Indians (CLE) | AA | 4–0 | Rochester Red Wings (STL) | IL |
| 1957 | Denver Bears (NYY) | AA | 4–1 | Buffalo Bisons (KCA) | IL |
| 1958 | Minneapolis Millers (BOS) | AA | 4–0 | Montreal Royals (LAD) | IL |
| 1959 | Havana Sugar Kings (CIN) | IL | 4–3 | Minneapolis Millers (BOS) | AA |
| 1960 | Louisville Colonels (MLN) | AA | 4–2 | Toronto Maple Leafs (none) | IL |
| 1961 | Buffalo Bisons (PHI) | IL | 4–0 | Louisville Colonels (MLN) | AA |
| 1962 | Atlanta Crackers (STL) | IL | 4–3 | Louisville Colonels (MLN) | AA |
| 1970 | Syracuse Chiefs (NYY) | IL | 4–1 | Omaha Royals (KCR) | AA |
| 1971 | Rochester Red Wings (BAL) | IL | 4–3 | Denver Bears (WSA) | AA |
| 1972 | Kodak World Baseball Classic held instead of Series | | | | |
| 1973 | Pawtucket Red Sox (BOS) | IL | 4–1 | Tulsa Oilers (STL) | AA |
| 1974 | No series held | | | | |
| 1975 | Evansville Triplets (DET) | AA | 4–1 | Tidewater Tides (NYM) | IL |

== Records ==
In Game 2 of the 1956 Junior World Series, Roger Maris set a record with seven runs batted in.

Game 4 of the 1944 Junior World Series between the Baltimore Orioles and Louisville Colonels drew 52,833 fans to Baltimore's Memorial Stadium, an all-time record for a Minor League Baseball postseason game.

== Notes ==
^{a}The 1919 championship series was referred to as the Junior World Series.
