= Triple-A Classic =

Baseball championship, 1988–1991

- Status: Defunct
- Location: Varies (see prose)
- Years active: 4
- Inaugurated: Sep 7 – 12, 1988
- Most recent: Sep 11 – 16, 1991
- Participants: League champions of the American Association and International League baseball leagues
- Organizer: Triple-A Alliance

The Triple-A Classic was an interleague postseason championship series held annually between the league champions of the American Association (AA) and International League (IL) Triple-A leagues of Minor League Baseball from 1988 to 1991.

Over a four-year period, the AA and IL had an interleague partnership called the Triple-A Alliance in which they played an interlocking schedule during the regular-season. After the leagues held separate playoffs to determine their champions, each winner met in the best-of-seven Triple-A Classic to determine an overall champion. The partnership and the Triple-A Classic were discontinued after the 1991 season due to poor attendance, high travel costs, and the difficulty of drawing up season schedules.

All four Triple-A Classics were won by American Association teams. The Indianapolis Indians won the first two series held in 1988 and 1989, the Omaha Royals won in 1990, and the Denver Zephyrs won the final series in 1991.

== History ==
=== Previous postseason series ===
Periodically from 1904 to 1975, the champions from the top-classification leagues of Minor League Baseball met in the postseason to determine a champion amongst them. The Little World Series (1904–1931) and Junior World Series (1932–1975) usually consisted of a best-of-seven (or eight) series modeled on the World Series of Major League Baseball. Most often, it was held between the champions of the International League (IL) and the American Association (AA), though the Pacific Coast League (PCL) participated in place of the IL in 1919. Officials from the IL voted to discontinue the series after 1975 due to their playoff teams being weakened by major league call-ups, the unavailability of some stadiums late in the year, high travel expenses, and low attendance, which led to low revenue for team owners. A Triple-A World Series was held in 1983 as a round-robin tournament between the champions of all three leagues, but this became a one-time event following poor attendance and the leagues being unable to decide on a suitable location for future events.

=== Triple-A Classic (1988–1991) ===
The Triple-A Alliance, an interleague partnership between the eight teams of the American Association (AA) and the eight teams of the International League (IL), was formed in 1987 at the annual Triple-A fall meeting. The Triple-A Pacific Coast League, located primarily in the Western United States, chose not to participate due to the difficulties and high costs associated with travel to cities in the other leagues. Beginning in 1988, each league held separate playoffs after their regular-seasons to determine their own champions, with the winners meeting in the Triple-A Classic, a best-of-seven series to determine an Alliance champion.

The 1988 Triple-A Classic was approved for only one year with the provision that it not be televised. The first three games were scheduled to be held at the International League champion's ballpark, while the fourth and any additional necessary games were to be played at the American Association champion's stadium. The AA's Indianapolis Indians defeated the IL's Rochester Red Wings, 4–2. Total attendance for the six-game-series was 24,602, an average of 4,100 per game.

Deeming the Triple-A Alliance and Classic a success, the Alliance approached Major League Baseball about continuing the Classic for three years. Permission was granted, and the interleague partnership was extended through 1991. Major League Baseball, however, refused to allow the series to be televised so as not to compete with their own televised pennant race games. The first three games of the 1989 Classic were scheduled for the AA champion's ballpark and the remaining games at that of the IL champion. Home-field advantage continued to alternate each year.

On July 9, 1991, at the Triple-A All-Star Game, International League team owners voted, 5–3, to discontinue interleague play with the American Association after the season. Randy Mobley, alliance commissioner and president of the AA, persuaded the IL to wait until the winter meetings to make a final decision. However, that September at the Triple-A fall meeting, the IL voted 4–3, with one abstention, to terminate the alliance, while the AA was unanimous in wishing to continue. A combination of poor attendance, travel costs, and difficulty in drawing up season schedules were all factors in their decision to end the partnership.

The final Triple-A Classic was won by the AA's Denver Zephyrs, 4–1, versus the Columbus Clippers. Six years later, Triple-A owners voted for a realignment plan that resulted in the American Association disbanding and its teams being absorbed by the International League and Pacific Coast League after the 1997 season. This paved the way for a revival of the Triple-A World Series in 1998.

== Results ==
Key
†	Indicates home team

=== 1988 Triple-A Classic ===
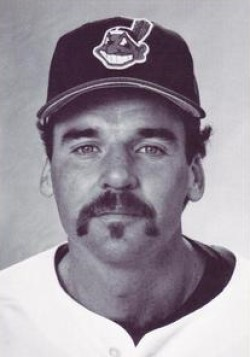
Tom Waddell struck out the final batter in Indianapolis' Game Six series victory.

The Indianapolis Indians qualified for the 1988 Triple-A Classic by winning the AA championship over the Omaha Royals, 3–1. The Rochester Red Wings won the IL championship and a series berth by defeating the Tidewater Tides, 3–1. The first three games were to be held at Rochester's Silver Stadium, while the remaining games were to be played at Indianapolis' Owen J. Bush Stadium.

In Game One, Rochester defeated Indianapolis, 3–2. The Indians led 2–0 until the bottom of the eighth inning, when the Red Wings' Ken Landreaux tied the game with a two-run home run. Craig Worthington hit the game-winning single in the bottom of the ninth. Rochester took a 2–0 series lead by winning Game Two, 5–0. Landreaux collected four of his team's five RBIs with a third-inning grand slam. Pete Harnisch pitched a complete game shutout for the Red Wings. In Game Three, Indianapolis starting pitcher Randy Johnson tossed a complete game and allowed only 2 runs on 8 hits while his team scored 10 runs on 16 hits in a 10–2 Indians win. Paul Noce led the scoring with three RBIs collected in a bases-loaded triple in the eighth. Indianapolis evened the series with an 11–8 win in Game Four. The Indians' Darryl Motley and Tim Hulett each had three RBIs in the high-scoring affair. Indianapolis made it three-straight victories with an 8–4 Game Five win. The Indians broke a 4–4 tie in the bottom of the seventh inning when Mark Bailey drove in Alonzo Powell for the decisive run. Game Six remained scoreless until the Indians collected three unearned runs in the bottom of the sixth. The Red Wings got a run in the top of the ninth, to make the score 3–1. Then, with the go-ahead run at home plate, runners at first and second base, two outs, and a 2–2 count, Tom Waddell struck out Carl Nichols with a fastball to win the game and give Indianapolis a 4–2 series win. Third baseman Tim Hulett, who had a batting average of .286 with 6 RBIs, was selected as the series MVP.

1988 Triple-A Classic results
Game	Date	Winning team (MLB affiliation)	League	Score	Losing team (MLB affiliation)	League	Attendance	Ref.
1	September 7	Rochester Red Wings^{†} (BAL)	IL	4–3	Indianapolis Indians (MON)	AA	3,027	
2	September 8	Rochester Red Wings^{†} (BAL)	IL	5–0	Indianapolis Indians (MON)	AA	4,345	
3	September 9	Indianapolis Indians (MON)	AA	10–2	Rochester Red Wings^{†} (BAL)	IL	8,840	
4	September 10	Indianapolis Indians^{†} (MON)	AA	11–8	Rochester Red Wings (BAL)	IL	3,532	
5	September 11	Indianapolis Indians^{†} (MON)	AA	8–4	Rochester Red Wings (BAL)	IL	2,029	
6	September 12	Indianapolis Indians^{†} (MON)	AA	3–1	Rochester Red Wings (BAL)	IL	2,829	
Indianapolis won the series, 4–2.

=== 1989 Triple-A Classic ===
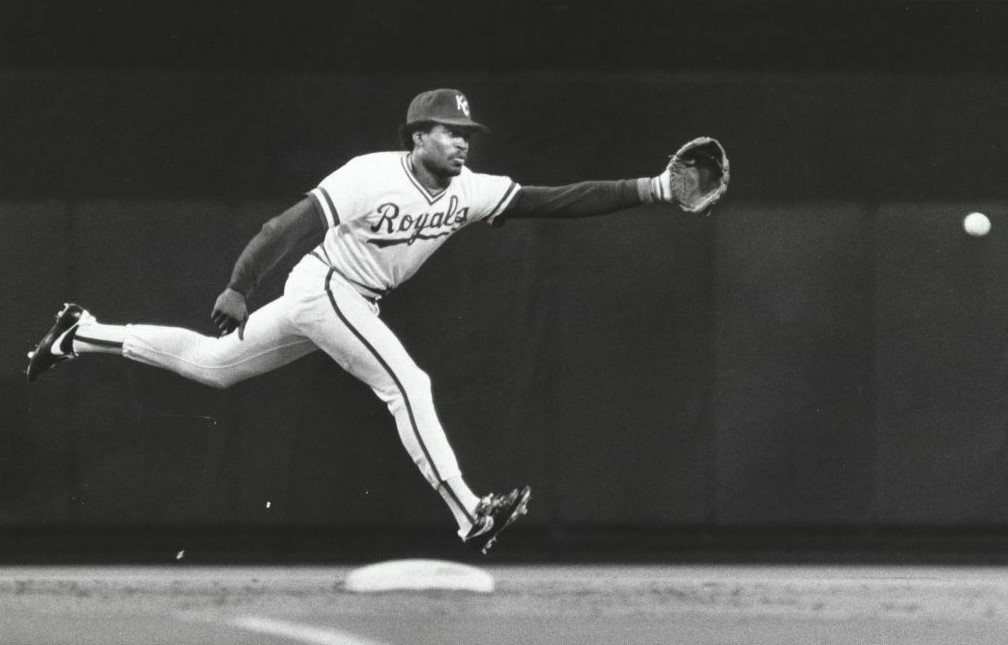
Darryl Motley was selected as the 1989 Triple-A Classic MVP.

The Indianapolis Indians qualified for the 1989 Triple-A Classic, their second appearance in the series, by winning the AA championship versus the Omaha Royals, 3–2. The Richmond Braves qualified by winning the IL championship against the Syracuse Chiefs, 3–2. The first three games were to be held at Indianapolis' Owen J. Bush Stadium before the remainder of the series shifted to The Diamond in Richmond.

Indianapolis opened the series with a 7–4 win in Game One. They took the lead in the bottom of the third inning on a three-run home run by Razor Shines and did not relinquish. Game Two was halted after four innings due to rain, with the Indians leading 5–2. After a nearly four-hour delay, it was postponed and rescheduled for the next day as a day-night doubleheader. The Alliance's rules allowed for completing suspended games from the point they were stopped, but Alliance commissioner Harold Cooper ruled that it did not apply to playoff games. As a result, the game would be played over from the start. In the replayed Game Two, Richmond got out to an early 2–0 lead in the first, but Indianapolis scored four runs in the fifth and held the lead for a 4–3 victory. The Indians also won the nightcap by a score of 4–3. In Game Four, Indianapolis scored five runs in the fifth inning to erase a 3–0 Braves lead on the way to a 7–4 win, a four-game sweep, and their second Triple-A Classic title. Outfielder Darryl Motley was selected as the series MVP after he hit .371 with 6 RBIs.

1989 Triple-A Classic results
Game	Date	Winning team (MLB affiliation)	League	Score	Losing team (MLB affiliation)	League	Attendance	Ref.
1	September 7	Indianapolis Indians^{†} (MON)	AA	7–4	Richmond Braves (ATL)	IL	3,029	
—	September 8	Postponed (rain). Rescheduled for September 9 as part of a doubleheader. (Note: With Indianapolis leading 5–2 after four innings, the game was postponed and rescheduled after a four-hour rain delay.)					3,029	
2	September 9 (1)	Indianapolis Indians^{†} (MON)	AA	4–3	Richmond Braves (ATL)	IL	3,011	
3	September 9 (2)	Indianapolis Indians^{†} (MON)	AA	4–3	Richmond Braves (ATL)	IL	3,011	
4	September 10	Indianapolis Indians (MON)	AA	7–4	Richmond Braves^{†} (ATL)	IL	7,301	
Indianapolis won the series, 4–0.

=== 1990 Triple-A Classic ===
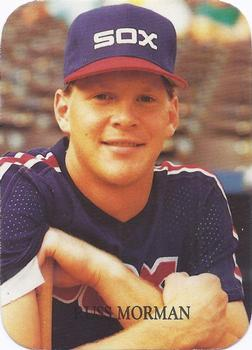
Russ Morman was the MVP of the 1990 Triple-A Classic.

The Omaha Royals secured a spot in the 1990 Triple-A Classic by winning the AA championship over the Nashville Sounds, 3–2. The Rochester Red Wings qualified for their second Classic by winning the IL championship against the Columbus Clippers, 3–2. The first three games were to be held at Rochester's Silver Stadium, and the rest of the series was to be played at Omaha's Johnny Rosenblatt Stadium.

Rochester took Game One, 4–3, behind the bat of Chris Hoiles, who hit a three-run home run in the first inning. Carrying a 4–3 lead into the ninth inning of Game Two, it looked like the Red Wings would make it two wins in a row until the Royals rallied for four runs on the way to a 7–4 victory. Omaha's Russ Morman singled to tie the game, and Tommy Hinzo tripled in two runs for the lead. Game Three remained tied, 4–4, until the top of the 12th when the Royals' Chito Martínez drove in the winning run for a 5–4 win. The Royals won Game Four, in which the two teams combined for 33 hits, 9–7. Omaha scored four runs in the first inning of Game Five, which would be all they needed. The Royals won the game, 9–3, and the Triple-A Classic, 4–1. Omaha first baseman Russ Morman was selected as the series MVP for his .571 average with 3 home runs and 9 RBIs.

1990 Triple-A Classic results
Game	Date	Winning team (MLB affiliation)	League	Score	Losing team (MLB affiliation)	League	Attendance	Ref.
1	September 10	Rochester Red Wings^{†} (BAL)	IL	4–3	Omaha Royals (KCR)	AA	2,435	
2	September 11	Omaha Royals (KCR)	AA	7–4	Rochester Red Wings^{†} (BAL)	IL	4,071	
3	September 12	Omaha Royals (KCR)	AA	7–4 (12)	Rochester Red Wings^{†} (BAL)	IL	4,896	
4	September 13	Omaha Royals^{†} (KCR)	AA	9–7	Rochester Red Wings (BAL)	IL	5,012	
5	September 14	Omaha Royals^{†} (KCR)	AA	9–3	Rochester Red Wings (BAL)	IL	8,207	
Omaha won the series, 4–1.

=== 1991 Triple-A Classic ===
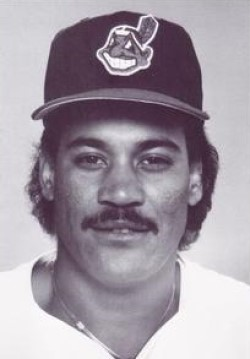
Carmen Castillo scored the winning run in Denver's Game Five series victory.

The Denver Zephyrs qualified for the 1991 Triple-A Classic by winning the AA championship over the Buffalo Bisons, 3–2. The Columbus Clippers secured their spot by sweeping the Pawtucket Red Sox, 3–0, to win the IL championship. The first three games were scheduled to be held at Denver's Mile High Stadium before the remainder of the series moved to Columbus' Cooper Stadium.

Denver took Game One, 5–2, behind the starting pitching of Mark Kiefer, who did not allow a hit until the fifth inning. Columbus threatened in the ninth, but reliever Tim Fortugno retired the last two batters with the bases loaded. The Zephyrs took a two-game lead with a 13–1 victory in Game Two. William Suero collected three RBIs and came around to score three runs. Though the Zephyrs managed only four hits, Denver won Game Three, 3–2. Game Four was postponed after the Clippers' uniforms and equipment did not reach the stadium in time for the game. Played the next night, Columbus won Game Four, 10–1, with the crucial runs being scored in the first inning on a ground rule double by John Ramos and a groundout by Torey Lovullo. In an extra-innings Game Five, Denver's William Suero reached second base on a two-base error, advanced to third on a sacrifice bunt by Jim Olander, and scored what would be the winning run on a ground out by Carmen Castillo in the top of the 11th. Denver held on to the lead, winning the game, 5–4, and the Classic, 4–1. Zephyrs starter Mark Kiefer, who earned the win in Game One and stuck out 10 batters over eight innings, was named the series MVP.

1991 Triple-A Classic results
Game	Date	Winning team (MLB affiliation)	League	Score	Losing team (MLB affiliation)	League	Attendance	Ref.
1	September 11	Denver Zephyrs^{†} (MIL)	AA	5–2	Columbus Clippers (NYY)	IL	—	
2	September 12	Denver Zephyrs^{†} (MIL)	AA	13–1	Columbus Clippers (NYY)	IL	—	
3	September 13	Denver Zephyrs^{†} (MIL)	AA	3–2	Columbus Clippers (NYY)	IL	—	
—	September 14	Postponed (equipment). Rescheduled for September 15. (Note: The game was postponed and rescheduled after the Clippers' uniforms and equipment did not reach Columbus in time for the game.)					—	
4	September 15	Columbus Clippers^{†} (NYY)	IL	10–1	Denver Zephyrs (MIL)	AA	—	
5	September 16	Denver Zephyrs (MIL)	AA	5–4 (11)	Columbus Clippers^{†} (NYY)	IL	—	
Denver won the series, 4–1.

=== Overall ===
All four Triple-A Classics were won by American Association teams. The Indianapolis Indians won the first two series held in 1988 and 1989, the Omaha Royals won in 1990, and the Denver Zephyrs won the final series in 1991.

Overall Triple-A Classic results
Year	Winning team (MLB affiliation)	League	Score	Losing team (MLB affiliation)	League	Attendance	Ref.
1988	Indianapolis Indians (MON)	AA	4–2	Rochester Red Wings (BAL)	IL	24,602	
1989	Indianapolis Indians (MON)	AA	4–0	Richmond Braves (ATL)	IL	19,381	
1990	Omaha Royals (KCR)	AA	4–1	Rochester Red Wings (BAL)	IL	24,621	
1991	Denver Zephyrs (MIL)	AA	4–1	Columbus Clippers (NYY)	IL	—	

== Most Valuable Player Award ==
Each year, one player from the winning team was recognized for their outstanding play in the series and given the Most Valuable Player (MVP) Award.

Most Valuable Player Award winners
Year	Player	Team (MLB affiliation)	League	Position	Ref.
1988	Tim Hulett	Indianapolis Indians (MON)	AA	Third baseman	
1989	Darryl Motley	Indianapolis Indians (MON)	AA	Outfielder	
1990	Russ Morman	Omaha Royals (KCR)	AA	First baseman	
1991	Mark Kiefer	Denver Zephyrs (MIL)	AA	Starting pitcher	

== See also ==
- Triple-A baseball awards
