= St. Paul Saints (1901–1960) =

- 1901–1960; Saint Paul, Minnesota

Minor league affiliations
- Class: Triple-A (1946–1962); Double-A (1908–1945); Class A (1901–1907)
- League: American Association (1902–1960); Western League (1901)

Major league affiliations
- Team: Chicago White Sox (1933–1942); Brooklyn/Los Angeles Dodgers (1944–1960)

Minor league titles
- Class titles (1): 1924
- League titles (6): 1903; 1904; 1919; 1920; 1922; 1924; 1931; 1948

Team data
- Name: St. Paul Apostles (1914); St. Paul Saints (1901–1913, 1915–1960)
- Ballpark: Midway Stadium (1957-1960); Lexington Park (1901-1956); Downtown Park (1903-1909)

The St. Paul Saints were a 20th-century Minor League Baseball team that played in the American Association from 1901 to 1960 in the city of St. Paul, Minnesota. The 1920, 1922, and 1923 Saints are recognized as being among the 100 greatest minor league teams of all time.

== History ==
After decades of independence, the Saints became a farm club affiliate of the Chicago White Sox (1936–1942) and the Brooklyn/Los Angeles Dodgers (1944–1960). Their Minnesota rivals, the Minneapolis Millers, were during different periods the top minor league affiliate of the New York Giants and the Boston Red Sox.

The Saints played the first two years at the Dale and Aurora Grounds in St. Paul. The Saints also played from 1903 to 1909 at Downtown Park located on Robert Street between 12th and 13th Streets, and at the original Lexington Park at Lexington and University Avenue until 1909 when Lexington Park became their permanent home; prior to that time, they played weekdays at Downtown Park and at Lexington on some weekends and during holiday weekends in order to accommodate larger crowds. A fire in 1913 led to the renovation of Lexington Park; the "new" ballpark had a seating capacity of 10,000; it served as the home of the Saints through 1956. From 1957 to 1960 the Saints played at Midway Stadium, a modern ballpark located at 1000 North Snelling Avenue with a seating capacity of more than 13,000.

The two rival Twin Cities ball clubs played heated "streetcar double-headers" on holidays, playing one game in each city. Over the years 1902–1960, the Saints compiled a 4719–4435 record, second only in winning percentage to the Millers' .524. The Saints won nine league pennants and won the Little World Series championship in 1924, topping the Baltimore Orioles in ten games.

When the Minnesota Twins came to the Twin Cities in 1961, the Saints moved to Omaha, Nebraska, and became the Omaha Dodgers.

A newer version of the team began play in 1993 and is currently the AAA affiliate of the Minnesota Twins.

== Notable players ==
- Sandy Amoros (1951)
- Ginger Beaumont (1911)
- Joe Black (1951)
- Ralph Branca (1945–1946)
- Ben Chapman (1929)
- Pat Collins (1925)
- Chuck Dressen (1921–1924)
- Leo Durocher (1927)
- Bubbles Hargrave (1918–1920, 1929)
- Miller Huggins (1901–1903)
- Mark Koenig (1921–1922, 1924–1925)
- Clem Labine (1949–1952)
- Gene Mauch (1946)
- Chief Meyers (1908)
- Cy Morgan (1906)
- Johnny Murphy (1930–1931)
- Dick Williams (1954)
- Don Zimmer (1953)

=== Baseball Hall of Famers ===
St. Paul Saints (1901–1960) Hall of Famers
| Inductee | Position | Tenure | Inducted |
|---|---|---|---|
| Dick Williams | 2B | 1954 | 2002 |
| Walter Alston | Manager | 1948-1949 | 1983 |
| Roy Campanella | C | 1948 | 1969 |
| Duke Snider | CF | 1947 | 1980 |
| Lefty Gomez | P | 1930 | 1972 |
| Leo Durocher | SS | 1927 | 1994 |
| Bill McKechnie | 3B | 1912-1913 | 1962 |
| Miller Huggins | 2B | 1901-1903 | 1964 |
