= Cleveland Bearcats =

- 1914–1915; Cleveland, Ohio

Minor league affiliations
- Previous classes: Double-A (1914–15)
- Previous leagues: American Association (1914–15)

Major league affiliations
- Previous teams: unaffiliated (1914–15)

Minor league titles
- League titles: none

Team data
- Previous names: Cleveland Spiders (1915); Cleveland Bearcats (1914)
- Previous parks: League Park (1914–15)

The Cleveland Bearcats were an American professional Minor League Baseball team that played in Cleveland, Ohio, in 1914 and 1915 as members of the American Association. They shared League Park with the American League's Cleveland Naps. After the 1913 season, Charles Somers, owner of the Toledo Mud Hens and Cleveland Naps, relocated the Toledo team to Cleveland. The team played the 1914 season as the Cleveland Bearcats but became the Cleveland Spiders in 1915. The team moved back to Toledo in 1916.
