= Kansas City Blues (American Association) =

- 1888–1954; (1888, 1890–1891, 1893–1901, 1902–1954); Kansas City, Missouri

Minor league affiliations
- Class: Triple-A (1946–1954); Double-A(1908–1945); Class A (1902–1907)
- League: American Association (1902–1954); Western League (1901); American League (1900); Western League (1894–1899); Western Association (1888, 1890–1891, 1893)

Major league affiliations
- Team: New York Yankees (1936–1954); Pittsburgh Pirates (1935)

Minor league titles
- Class titles (3): 1923; 1929; 1938
- League titles (10): 1888; 1890; 1898; 1901; 1918; 1923; 1929; 1938; 1952; 1953

Team data
- Name: Kansas City Blues (1902; 1904–1954); Kansas City Cowboys (1903)
- Ballpark: Blues Stadium (1923–1954)

The Kansas City Blues were a minor league baseball team located in Kansas City, Missouri, in the Midwestern United States. The team was one of the eight founding members of the American Association.

The Blues did not field particularly competitive teams until 1918, when they won the AA pennant. The team won again in 1923, and again in 1929. They won the Junior World Series championship both years, defeating the Baltimore Orioles and the Rochester Red Wings of the International League, respectively, in best-of-nine series.

In 1935, the Blues became a farm club of the Pittsburgh Pirates. In 1936 they became an affiliate of the New York Yankees. They won the AA championships five times in the 1930s and 1940s. They defeated the Newark Bears, another Yankees farm club, in the 1938 Junior World Series.

When the American League Philadelphia Athletics moved to Kansas City in 1955, the Blues moved to Denver, Colorado, and became the Denver Bears.

The 1923, 1929, and 1939 Blues were recognized as being among the 100 greatest minor league teams of all time.

== History ==
Preceded in Kansas City by the Kansas City Blues of the Western League and Western Association, the 1902 Kansas City Blues were admitted to the American Association. They changed their name to the Kansas City Cowboys for the 1903 season before reverting back to the Blues nickname in 1904. They won their first league championship in 1918. They would win two more, one in 1923 and the second in 1928. However, the onset of The Great Depression took a toll on the team as attendance began to fall. At one point, the Blues lead the league in attendance, but that number would soon be cut in half. Frustrated with how things were going in Kansas City, owner George Muehlebach sold the franchise to a group headed by Hollywood actor Joe E. Brown, and included former MLB star Tris Speaker. Speaker would also serve as the team's manager. The change in ownership did little to spark interest in the team and Speaker was replaced as manager with Nick Allen, who had won a championship with St. Paul. The franchise was sold again, this time to Kansas City resident and former Cubs player Johnny Kling, who in turn hired Roger Peckinpaugh, who had just been released as manager by the Cleveland Indians to take over as manager for Kansas City.

The Blues still struggled with attendance, though it did improve, even if Kansas City finished in last place. Another change was made as Peckinbaugh was released and Dutch Zwilling, who piloted the Blues to their 1929 championship, was brought back as manager. The Blues began to rise in the league standings and the attendance rose as well. Another ownership change was afoot as Kling sold the franchise to the New York Yankees who quickly made the Blues one of their farm teams. The home opener in 1939 was a near sell out and the fans went home happy, as outfielder Vince Dimaggio hit a home run in his first at bat. The Blues routed Louisville 8-2 en route to a season that saw Kansas City win 107 games. However, the Blues lost to Indianapolis in the playoffs. One of the stars of the Blues that season was a 21 year old shortstop named Phil Rizzuto.

The Blues would never have a team as great as the 1939 squad again, but the team was a launching pad for future major league players like Johnny Lindell and in later years, Mickey Mantle. And by the 1950s it was over for the Blues altogether, as the franchise ceased once the A's moved from Philadelphia to Kansas City.

== Notable alumni ==
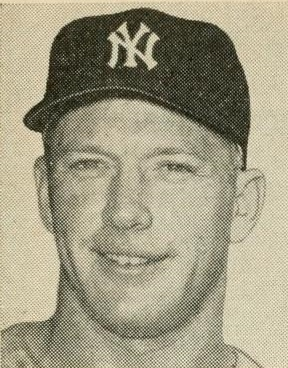
Mickey Mantle

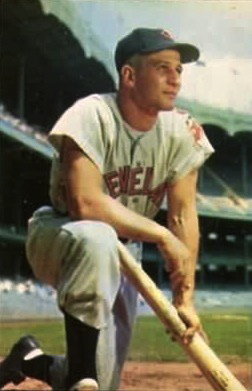
Al Rosen

Hall of Fame alumni

- Jake Beckley, First Basemen, Manager, 1908-1909
- Burleigh Grimes, Manager, 1946
- Mickey Mantle, outfielder and three-time AL MVP
- Phil Rizzuto, Sporting News Minor League Player of the Year in 1940
- Tris Speaker, Manager, 1933
- Casey Stengel, Right Fielder, 1910-1911; Manager, 1945

Players and managers Well-known members of the 1929 Junior World Series-winning Kansas City Blues included:

- Dutch Zwilling, manager
- Clyde "Pea Ridge" Day, pitcher
- Joe Kuhel, 23-year-old first baseman who later played for the Washington Senators
- Lynn (Line Drive) Nelson, pitcher
- Fred Nicholson, outfielder
- Bill Wambsganss, 35-year-old shortstop who was best known for making an unassisted triple play in the 1920 World Series

Other well-known players and managers include:

- Harry Craft, manager in the 1950s
- George Leslie Cochran, switch-hitting infielder
- Dick Kryhoski, first baseman in the late 1940s
- Al Rosen, 4x All Star, MVP
- Homer "Doc" Smoot, outfielder in 1910-11
- Beals Becker, outfielder, 1916–19, 1922–24
- Charlie Silvera, Catcher 1946

== See also ==
- Sports in the Kansas City metropolitan area

Preceded by none	Boston Red Sox; Double-A affiliate 1934	Succeeded by San Diego Padres & Syracuse Chiefs (1936)
