= American Association (1902–1997) =

Defunct baseball class-AAA minor league from 1902 to 1962 and 1969 to 1997

- Most recent season or competition: 1997 American Association season
- Classification: Triple-A (1946–1997); Double-A (1912–1945); Class A (1903–1911); Independent (1902)
- Sport: Baseball
- Founded: 1902
- Folded: 1997
- No. of teams: 30 (total)
- Country: United States
- Last champion: Buffalo Bisons (1997)
- Most titles: Louisville Colonels (15)

The American Association (AA) was a Minor League Baseball league that operated primarily in the Midwestern and South Central United States from 1902 to 1962 and 1969 to 1997. For most of its existence, it was classified as a Triple-A league or its equivalent, one grade below Major League Baseball.

A league champion was determined at the end of every season. The Louisville Colonels won 15 American Association titles, the most in the league's history, followed by the Indianapolis Indians (12) and the Columbus Red Birds (10).

Intermittently throughout its history, the American Association champion competed against the champion of the International League, which operated in the Eastern U.S., to determine an overall Triple-A champion. On rare occasions, the champion of the West Coast-based Pacific Coast League also participated. The first such meetings were called the Little World Series. Later, the teams would also compete in the Junior World Series, Triple-A World Series, and Triple-A Classic. Additional interleague play consisted of the regular season's Triple-A Alliance and Triple-A All-Star Game.

== History ==
=== First run (1902–1962) ===
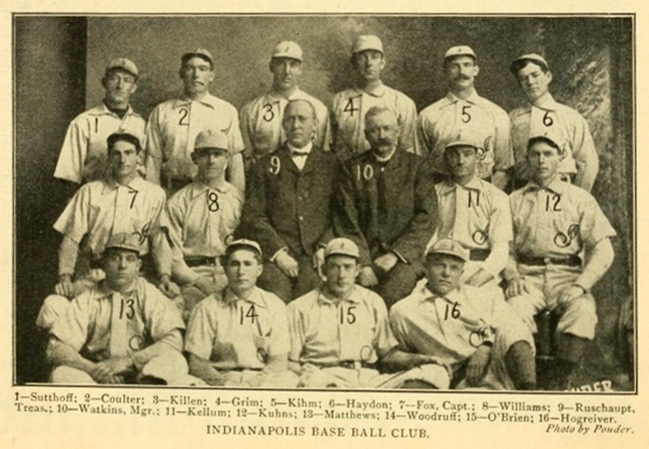
The Indianapolis Indians won the first American Association championship (1902).

The American Association was formed in the fall of 1901 by Thomas J. Hickey, who had recently been appointed president of the Western League and was a founder of the National Association of Professional Baseball Leagues. Hickey resigned from the Western League to lead the new American Association, which elected not to join the National Association, thus becoming an "outlaw" league. The eight-team circuit fielded clubs in Columbus, Ohio; Indianapolis, Indiana; Kansas City, Missouri; Louisville, Kentucky; Milwaukee, Wisconsin; Minneapolis, Minnesota; Saint Paul, Minnesota; and Toledo, Ohio. The league's inaugural 140-game schedule was to be played from late April to late September 1902. At the end of that season, the first American Association championship was won by the Indianapolis Indians.

The American Association became members of the National Association after two seasons and was then classified as a Class A circuit, at the time the highest minor league level. It would remain one level below the majors for the remainder of its run.

In 1912, it was reclassified as a Double-A league. Through the first 12 years of play, the AA established itself as one of the premier minor leagues in the country. Its teams, featuring former major league players and top minor leaguers, were both competitive and profitable.

In 1914, the newly-formed Federal League placed teams in Indianapolis and Kansas City as well as other locals near American Association teams. One of only a few franchise shifts in the first incarnation of the AA occurred in 1914 when the Toledo Mud Hens moved to Cleveland, Ohio, as the Cleveland Bearcats. Looking to keep the Federal League out of Cleveland, which would have been in direct competition with his American League franchise, owner Charles Somers brought in his Toledo team to share League Park with the Cleveland Naps. The club returned to Toledo two seasons later after the dissolution of the Federal League. The outbreak of World War I brought further difficulties. A 1917 44-game interleague schedule with the International League was called off before Opening Day. In 1918, following a federal government mandate that men of draft age, such as the AA's players, would be eligible for the draft, the league cancelled the rest of the season on July 21. The league resumed play after the war, in 1919, and continued to be a successful venture despite the decade's problems.

Much like other professional sports at the time, the 1920s were a golden age for the American Association. The league drew record crowds that witnessed fast-paced games usually dominated by offence. This success, as well as its forthcoming innovations, positioned the AA to fare well during the Great Depression. On June 9, 1930, the league's first night game was played in Indianapolis as the Indians defeated the St. Paul Saints, 1–0, at Washington Park. Its first All-Star Game was played in 1934. The Minneapolis Millers, who were in first place at midseason, beat the league's stars, 13–6.

Until 1931, the league champions were simply the regular season pennant winners. In 1932, the first playoffs were introduced for determining champions. The league was divided into two divisions with the top team in each division meeting in a best-of-seven series to determine a winner. The Columbus Red Birds beat the Minneapolis Millers, four games to two, for the first AA playoff championship. The system was utilized again in 1933, but abandoned when Columbus again bested Minneapolis and advanced to play in the Junior World Series despite the Millers having the best record. No playoffs were held in 1935. In 1936, the league adopted the Shaughnessy playoff system in which the top four teams qualified for postseason play. The AA would still recognize a pennant winner, but the playoff champion would represent the league at the Junior World Series and be the recipient of a Governors' Cup. In the semi-finals, Indianapolis ousted St. Paul, and the Milwaukee Brewers swept the Kansas City Blues. The Brewers went on to defeat the Indians, four games to one.

Unlike other minor leagues, the American Association survived the 1930s as the only circuit to play its full season schedule without stoppage, reducing its membership, or any teams disbanding. As with other leagues, it suffered from low attendance and a lesser quality of play during World War II, but quickly returned to a period of prosperity after the war. In 1946, the AA was reclassified again, this time as a Triple-A league.

During the 1948 season, Brooklyn Dodger Roy Campanella was reassigned to the Saint Paul Saints. On May 18, he become the first person to break the color barrier in the American Association when he took the field in a game.

The American Association's attendance base began to be eroded significantly in the 1950s and early 1960s due to expansion and westward migration of Major League Baseball teams into several of the AA's larger member cities, especially Milwaukee, Kansas City, and Minneapolis-Saint Paul. Another contributing factor was the increased frequency of televised games, both of MLB teams and the AA's own clubs, enticing fans to watch baseball from the comfort of their own homes. Toledo suffered such poor attendance that the team folded during the 1952 season and was transferred to Charleston, West Virginia. In 1953, the league lost the Milwaukee Brewers who were displaced by the National League's Milwaukee Braves. In 1959, the league expanded to 10 teams when it acquired three former Texas League clubs, but expensive and lengthy travel across the spread-out league coupled with dwindling attendance was damaging to what had once been a flourishing circuit. By 1961, the league had been reduced to six clubs—just one a charter city—after having lost Kansas City and Minneapolis–St. Paul to the major leagues.

After the 1962 season, the American Association disbanded, and some of its member teams were distributed between the Pacific Coast League (PCL) and the International League (IL), while others (the Louisville Colonels and Omaha Dodgers) folded altogether. The Indianapolis Indians joined the IL, and the Dallas-Fort Worth Rangers, Denver Bears, and Oklahoma City 89ers went to the PCL.

=== Second run (1969–1997) ===
With major league expansion in 1969 and the need for four new Triple-A farm teams, the American Association was revived. The creation of a third Triple-A league would alleviate some of the travel costs incurred by having only two leagues spread out across the country. The new American Association would field six teams in 1969. It re-acquired its old Indianapolis; Denver, Colorado; and Oklahoma City, Oklahoma, territories from the PCL, revived the Omaha, Nebraska, franchise, and added two cities (Des Moines, Iowa, and Tulsa, Oklahoma) that were new to the circuit. The teams played a 140-game schedule with no All-Star Game or playoffs. In 1970, the AA returned to a two-division format, reintroduced the All-Star Game and playoffs, and expanded to eight cities with the addition of Wichita, Kansas, and Evansville, Indiana.

The 1970s were a stable time for the Association with strong attendance and only minor franchise shifts. The league thrived during the 1980s and 1990s, along with all of Minor League Baseball as an industry. Affordable ticket prices, exciting giveaways and promotions, and new ballparks helped lure fans, especially families, back to minor league games. Half of the top-ten drawing minor league clubs in 1985 were members of the American Association. From 1982 to 1986, the Louisville Redbirds led all of Minor League Baseball in attendance, including the 1983 season in which the club drew over one million fans.

From 1988 to 1991, the Association participated in interleague play with the International League as a part of the Triple-A Alliance. The two leagues played an interlocking schedule consisting of 40 to 44 interleague games per team. At the end of each season, an Alliance champion was determined in the Triple-A Classic, a best-of-seven postseason series. All three Triple-A leagues, began participating in the Triple-A All-Star Game in 1988. The first of these events was held at the Buffalo Bisons' newly-constructed Pilot Field on July 13, 1988. In the inaugural game, a team of American League-affiliated All-Stars defeated a team of National League affiliates, 2–1. High attendance in Buffalo and across the league helped the Association draw over 3.6 million fans in both 1988 and 1989, the highest ever recorded by a minor league.

The further expansion of Major League Baseball in 1998 spurred the re-alignment of the Triple-A classification from three leagues to two. The American Association disbanded for the second time following the 1997 season. The league's final championship was won by the Buffalo Bisons, who still possess the trophy. The AA's teams were again distributed to the remaining leagues for the 1998 season. The Iowa Cubs, Nashville Sounds, New Orleans Zephyrs, Oklahoma City 89ers, and Omaha Royals joined an enlarged, 16-team Pacific Coast League. The Buffalo Bisons, Indianapolis Indians and Louisville Redbirds became part of an expanded, 14-team International League.

== Interleague play ==
On and off, the American Association champion played against the International League's champion in a postseason series similar to Major League Baseball's World Series. The first Little World Series, as it was called from 1904 to 1931, saw the IL's Buffalo Bisons defeat the AA's St. Paul Saints, 2–1. The series was held again in 1906 and 1907, but not played again until 1917. Due to the war, there was no series in 1918, but it was revived in 1919 and then played steadily through 1931. The 1919 event was named the Junior World Series, which became the official name of the series in 1932, and pitted the AA's champion against the Pacific Coast League's champion. The Junior World Series, with the AA versus the IL, continued from 1932 to 1962, and was held sporadically thereafter (1970, 1971, 1973, and 1975). American Association teams won 27 Little/Junior World Series. All three Triple-A leagues participated in the 1983 Triple-A World Series. As part of the Triple-A Alliance, the AA and IL champions met in the Triple-A Classic from 1988 to 1991. All four Classics were won by Association teams.

From 1988 until the league's demise in 1997, players from all three Triple-A leagues were selected to play in the mid-season Triple-A All-Star Game. One team was made up of All-Stars from American League affiliates and the other of National League affiliates.

== Teams ==
=== 1969–1997 Timeline ===
- Columbus Senators (1902–1930) → Columbus Red Birds (1931–1954) → Omaha Cardinals (1955–1959)
- Dallas Rangers (1959) → Dallas-Fort Worth Rangers (1960–1962)
- Evansville Triplets (1970–1984) → Nashville Sounds (1985–1997)
- Houston Buffs (1959–1961) → Oklahoma City 89ers (1962, 1969–1997)
- Indianapolis Indians (1902–1962, 1969–1997)
- Iowa Oaks (1969–1981) → Iowa Cubs (1982–1997)
- Kansas City Blues (1902) →Kansas City Cowboys (1903) → Kansas City Blues (1904–1954) → Denver Bears (1955–1962, 1969–1983) → Denver Zephyrs (1984–1992) → New Orleans Zephyrs (1993–1997)
- Louisville Colonels (1902–1962)
- Milwaukee Brewers (1902–1952) → Toledo Sox (1953–1955) → Wichita Braves (1956–1958) → Fort Worth Cats (1959) → Dallas-Fort Worth Rangers (1960–1962)
- Minneapolis Millers (1902–1960)
- Omaha Royals (1969–1997)
- St. Paul Saints (1902–1913) → St. Paul Apostles (1914) → St. Paul Saints (1915–1960) → Omaha Dodgers (1961–1962)
- Toledo Mud Hens (1902–1913) → Cleveland Bearcats (1914) → Cleveland Spiders (1915) → Toledo Iron Men (1916–1918) → Toledo Mud Hens (1919–1952) → Charleston Senators (1952–1960)
- Tulsa Oilers (1969–1976) → New Orleans Pelicans (1977) → Springfield Redbirds (1978–1981) → Louisville Redbirds (1982–1997)
- Wichita Aeros (1970–1984) → Buffalo Bisons (1985–1997)

== Presidents ==
Fifteen presidents led the American Association:

- 1902–1903: Thomas J. Hickey
- 1904: J. Ed Grillo
- 1905–1909: Joseph D. O'Brien
- 1910–1916: Thomas M. Chivington
- 1917–1934: Thomas J. Hickey
- 1935–1945: George M. Troutman
- 1946: Roy Hamey
- 1947-1948: Frank C. Lane
- 1949–1952: Bruce Dudley
- 1953–1959: Ed Doherty
- 1960–1962: James Burris
- 1969–1971: Allie Reynolds
- 1972–1987: Joe Ryan
- 1988–1989: Ken Grandquist
- 1990–1991: Randy Mobley
- 1991–1997: Branch B. Rickey

== Champions ==
League champions were determined by different means over the American Association's 90 years of competition. From 1902 to 1931, the league champions were simply the regular-season pennant winners—the team with the best win–loss record at the conclusion of the regular season. The first playoffs for determining champions were held in 1933. The Louisville Colonels won 15 American Association titles, the most in the league's history, followed by the Indianapolis Indians (12) and the Columbus Red Birds (10).

== Awards ==
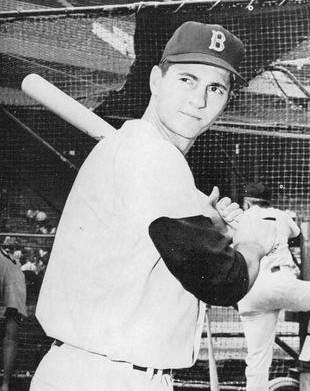
Carl Yastrzemski, who was inducted in the Baseball Hall of Fame in 1989, won the AA Rookie of the Year Award in 1960.

The American Association regularly honored outstanding players and team personnel at the end of each season.

=== MVP Award ===
The Most Valuable Player Award, introduced in 1929, was given to recognize the best player in the league. The first MVP Award went to shortstop Billy Rogell of the St. Paul Saints. The final award was given to outfielder Magglio Ordóñez of the Nashville Sounds.

=== Most Valuable Pitcher Award ===
The Most Valuable Pitcher Award, introduced in 1969, was given to recognize the best pitcher in the league. The first award was given to right-hander Sal Campisi of the Tulsa Oilers. The final award went to right-hander Rick Helling of the Oklahoma City 89ers in 1996. No winner was selected in 1997.

=== Rookie of the Year Award ===
The Rookie of the Year Award, introduced in 1946, was given to the best rookie player in the league. The first award was presented to first baseman Jerry Witte of the Toledo Mud Hens. The final award was given to outfielder and league MVP Magglio Ordóñez of the Nashville Sounds.

=== Manager of the Year Award ===
The Manager of the Year Award, introduced in 1945, was given to honor the best manager in the league. The first award went to George Selkirk of the Toledo Sox. The final award was issued to Dave Miley of the Indianapolis Indians.

== See also ==
- List of American Association no-hitters and perfect games
