= Darryl Motley =

American baseball player (born 1960)

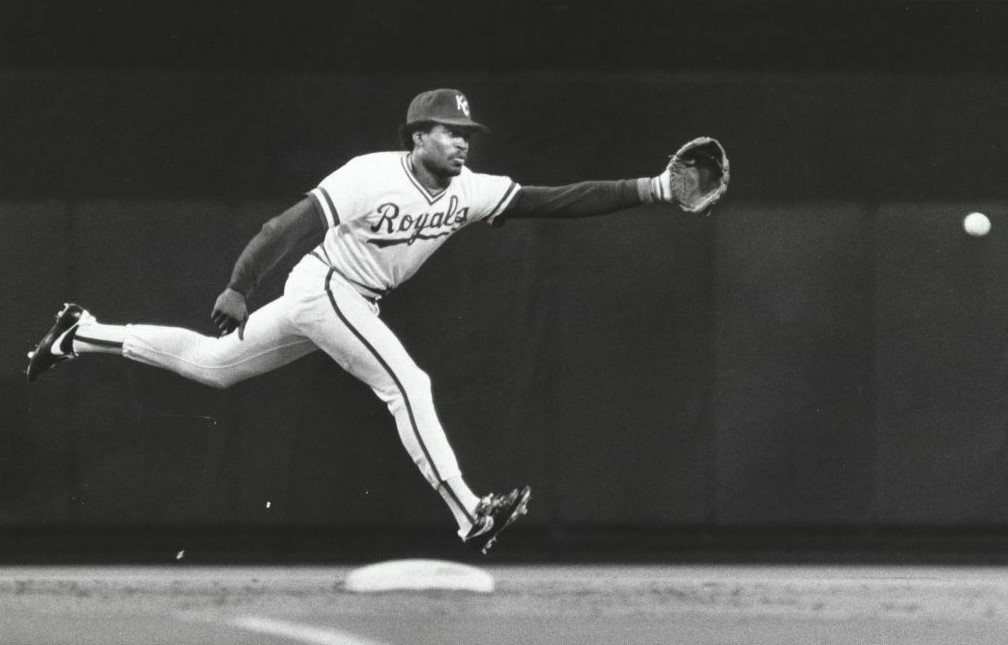
- Outfielder
- Born: January 21, 1960 (age 66); Muskogee, Oklahoma, U.S.
- Batted: Right Threw: Right

Professional debut
- MLB: August 10, 1981, for the Kansas City Royals
- NPB: July 1, 1992, for the Chiba Lotte Marines

Last appearance
- MLB: May 17, 1987, for the Atlanta Braves
- NPB: June 5, 1993, for the Chiba Lotte Marines

MLB statistics
- Batting average: .243
- Home runs: 44
- Runs batted in: 159

NPB statistics
- Batting average: .222
- Home runs: 7
- Runs batted in: 40
- Stats at Baseball Reference

Teams
- Kansas City Royals (1981, 1983–1986); Atlanta Braves (1986–1987); Chiba Lotte Marines (1992–1993)

Career highlights and awards
- World Series champion (1985)

Darryl DeWayne Motley (born January 21, 1960) is an American former Major League Baseball outfielder who played six seasons for the Kansas City Royals and Atlanta Braves between 1981 and 1987. In his MLB career, Motley played in 413 games, hit 44 home runs, 324 hits, 159 RBIs, and batted .243. Following his major league career, Motley played two seasons in Japan, 1992 and 1993, for the Chiba Lotte Marines.

== Career ==
Motley began 1985 as the Royals' starting left fielder, but after he struggled to begin the season, the team acquired Lonnie Smith on May 17 and moved the right-handed hitting Motley to right field to platoon with the left-handed hitting Pat Sheridan.

Motley, a right-handed hitting outfielder, hit a 2-run home run for the Royals against the St. Louis Cardinals in Game 7 of the 1985 World Series to give Kansas City an early 2–0 lead. Motley's home run into the left field bleachers came on a 3–2 pitch, after he had hit the preceding 3–2 pitch to the same area in the stands, but foul. Motley, upon seeing the ball curve foul, slammed his bat into the home-plate area, breaking it. After selecting a new bat from the bat-boy, Motley delivered the fatal blow to the Cardinals. He also caught Andy Van Slyke's fly ball for the final out of the Series.

In 1986, Motley contended with Sheridan for the right field job. This time, the Royals released Sheridan at the end of spring training, but they signed Rudy Law to platoon with Motley, then traded Motley very late in the year, on September 23, to the Atlanta Braves for Steve Shields.

He also played four years for the Fargo-Moorhead Redhawks of the Northern League, from 1996 to 1999. In the team's inaugural season in 1996, Motley hit .346 with 26 home runs and 103 RBI in 82 regular season games.
