= Columbus Red Birds =

- 1931–1954; Columbus, Ohio

Minor league affiliations
- Class: Triple-A (1946–1954); Double-A (1931–1945)
- League: American Association (1931–1954)

Major league affiliations
- Team: St. Louis Cardinals (1931–1954)

Minor league titles
- Class titles (6): 1933; 1934; 1941; 1942; 1943; 1950
- League titles (7): 1933; 1934; 1937; 1941; 1942; 1943; 1950

Team data
- Name: Columbus Red Birds (1931–1954)
- Ballpark: Red Bird Stadium (1931–1954)

The Columbus Red Birds were a top-level minor league baseball team that played in Columbus, Ohio, in the American Association from 1931 through 1954. The Columbus club, a member of the Association continuously since 1902, was previously known as the Columbus Senators (Columbus is the state capital). It was independently and locally owned through the 1920s.

The economic distress of the Great Depression was accompanied by the rise of the farm system — pioneered by the St. Louis Cardinals' Branch Rickey. The Cardinals purchased minor league teams at all levels to develop their talent as if on an assembly line, and when they needed a second top-level farm club (St. Louis already owned the Rochester Red Wings of the International League), they purchased the struggling Senators club and dubbed it the Red Birds, based on the popular nickname for the big-league club.

The first business manager of the Red Birds was a baseball novice named Larry MacPhail. A bold promoter, he supervised the building of Red Bird Stadium, championed night baseball games, and tried to make baseball more fan-friendly. Attendance tripled between 1930 and 1932. MacPhail left Columbus after a dispute with the Cardinals' ownership, and moved up to Major League Baseball as the general manager of three teams between 1933 and 1947, and earned a place in the Baseball Hall of Fame. The 1933 Red Birds were recognized as one of the 100 greatest minor league teams of all time.

Columbus produced a number of great players, including Hall of Famers Enos Slaughter and Billy Southworth. Slaughter (who batted .382 for the 1937 Red Birds with 245 hits), and won Association titles in 1933, 1934, 1937, 1941–43 and 1950. Southworth managed the 1932 Red Birds. In the early 1950s a series of losing teams, and the encroachment of television, depressed the Red Birds' attendance, and the club moved to Omaha, Nebraska, for the 1955 season and was re-christened the Omaha Cardinals.

Columbus immediately gained a new AAA team when the Ottawa A's franchise of the International League began playing there in 1955. This club, the Columbus Jets, moved to Charleston, West Virginia, in 1970. Ohio's capital was without baseball for seven years until 1977, when the Columbus Clippers joined the IL. The Clippers have played there ever since, most notably as the longtime AAA affiliate (1979–2006) of the New York Yankees. After a two-year stint as the Washington Nationals' top affiliate, in 2009 they became the AAA affiliate of the Cleveland Indians.

== Notable Red Birds alumni ==
- Walter Alston
- Sammy Baugh
- Ray Blades
- Bennie Borgmann
- Mort Cooper
- Nick Cullop
- Cot Deal
- Paul "Daffy" Dean
- Tony Freitas
- Chick Fullis
- Joe Garagiola
- Buddy Hassett
- Don Gutteridge
- Harvey Haddix
- Solly Hemus
- Rollie Hemsley
- Max Lanier
- Nemo Leibold
- Larry McPhail
- Sam Nahem
- Mickey Owen
- Rip Repulski
- Branch Rickey
- Jack Rothrock
- Mike Ryba
- Bill Sarni
- Burt Shotton
- Enos Slaughter
- Billy Southworth
- Harry "The Hat" Walker
- Phil Weintraub
- Burgess Whitehead
- Jack Winsett
- Ben Steiner

== See also ==
From 1936 through 1942, the parent Cardinals also operated the Columbus Red Birds of Columbus, Georgia, in the Class A Sally League. When the Sally League resumed play in 1946 after World War II, the Georgia-based farm club changed its name to the Columbus Cardinals.
