= Triple-A Alliance =

The Triple-A Alliance was an interleague partnership between the American Association (AA) and International League (IL) Triple-A leagues of Minor League Baseball from 1988 to 1991. The two leagues played an interlocking schedule consisting of 40 to 44 interleague games per team. At the end of each season, an Alliance champion was determined in the Triple-A Classic, a best-of-seven postseason series.

== History ==
Triple-A Alliance team locations:
American Association
International League

The Triple-A Alliance, with Harold Cooper as its commissioner, was formed on October 1, 1987, at the annual Triple-A fall meeting in Hollywood, Florida. Under the partnership, the 8 teams of the American Association and the 8 teams of the International League would play each other 5 times for a total of 40 interleague games in their 142-game schedules in 1988. The Triple-A Pacific Coast League, located primarily in the Western United States, chose not to participate due to the difficulties and high costs associated with travel to cities in the other leagues.

The AA and IL were each organized into two four-team divisions, East and West. At the end of the season, each league determined its own champion in a best-of-five series between division winners. The leagues' champions then met to determine an Alliance champion in the Triple-A Classic, a best-of-seven series. In the 1988 Classic, the AA's Indianapolis Indians defeated the IL's Rochester Red Wings, 4–2. Over the course of the season, the AA led with 187 interleague wins to the IL's 131 wins.

Both leagues reported increases in regular and postseason attendance during the Alliance's first year. The partnership was subsequently extended through 1991. In order to cut down on the amount of travel required by the two-day series often scheduled in the 1988 season, the 1989 slate was expanded to 146 games with 44 interleague games per team, increasing most interleague series to three games. The Indianapolis Indians repeated as Alliance champions, defeating the IL's Richmond Braves, 4–0, in the 1989 Triple-A Classic. The IL narrowly won the regular interleague series, 178–170. Each league set new attendance records with over five million people visiting Alliance ballparks. Commissioner Harold Cooper retired after the season and was succeeded by Randy Mobley who had served as administrator of the Alliance and the International League for the past two seasons.

In 1990, the Alliance was operated under the same 146-game schedule with 44 interleague contests per team. At the 1990 Triple-A Classic, the AA's Omaha Royals defeated the IL's Rochester Red Wings, 4–1. The AA won the regular season with 181 wins to the IL's 170.

Facing the possibility of increased costs to be incurred under a new Professional Baseball Agreement between Major and Minor League Baseball teams, the Alliance voted at the 1990 Winter Meetings to contract its interleague schedule to save on travel expenses. The 144-game 1991 schedule eliminated games between the AA West and IL East.

On July 9, 1991, at the Triple-A All-Star Game, International League team owners voted, 5–3, to discontinue interleague play with the American Association after the season. Despite an overall increase in attendance—a minor-league record 4,093,525 for the AA and an IL-record 2,958,482—six of eight IL teams had below-average attendances when hosting interleague teams. The combination of poor attendance, travel costs, and difficulty in drawing up season schedules were all factors in their decision to end the partnership. The final Triple-A Classic was won by the AA's Denver Zephyrs, 4–1, versus the Columbus Clippers. The IL bested their AA opponents, 139–99, in the regular season. After four years of interleague competition, the American Association's record stood at 637–618.

== Teams ==
American Association

- Buffalo Bisons (1988–1991)
- Denver Zephyrs (1988–1991)
- Indianapolis Indians (1988–1991)
- Iowa Cubs (1988–1991)
- Louisville Redbirds (1988–1991)
- Nashville Sounds (1988–1991)
- Oklahoma City 89ers (1988–1991)
- Omaha Royals (1988–1991)

International League

- Columbus Clippers (1988–1991)
- Maine Phillies (1988)
- Pawtucket Red Sox (1988–1991)
- Richmond Braves (1988–1991)
- Rochester Red Wings (1988–1991)
- Scranton/Wilkes-Barre Red Barons (1989–1991)
- Syracuse Chiefs (1988–1991)
- Tidewater Tides (1988–1991)
- Toledo Mud Hens (1988–1991)

== Season-by-season results ==
Over the all-time interleague series, American Association teams won 637 games, 19 more than the International League's 618 wins. The AA won the 1988 and 1990 regular season series, while the IL won the 1989 and 1991 series.

Year	AA Wins	IL Wins	Triple-A Classic	Refs.
1988	187	131	Indianapolis Indians (AA) defeat Rochester Red Wings (IL), 4–2	
1989	170	178	Indianapolis Indians (AA) defeat Richmond Braves (IL), 4–0	
1990	181	170	Omaha Royals (AA) defeat Rochester Red Wings (IL), 4–1	
1991	99	139	Denver Zephyrs (AA) defeat Columbus Clippers (IL), 4–1	
Totals	637	618	—	—

=== Championship ===
At the end of the season, the first-place team in each league's divisions faced off against one another in a best-of-five series to determine a league champion. The league champions went on to compete in a best-of-seven series, the Triple-A Classic, to determine an overall champion. All four Triple-A Classics were won by American Association teams, including two by the Indianapolis Indians.
