= American Association (1902–1997) Rookie of the Year Award =

American Association Rookie of the Year Award
- Sport: Baseball
- League: American Association
- Awarded for: Best regular-season rookie in the American Association
- Country: United States
- Presented by: American Association

History
- First award: Jerry Witte (1946)
- Final award: Magglio Ordóñez (1997)

The American Association Rookie of the Year Award was an annual award given to the best rookie player in Minor League Baseball's American Association based on their regular-season performance. Though the league was established in 1902, the award was not created until 1946. It continued to be issued through the 1962 season, after which the league disbanded. In 1969, both the league and the award were revived, and the honor continued to be given until the league disbanded for a second time after the 1997 season.

Eighteen outfielders won the Rookie of the Year Award, the most of any position. First basemen, second basemen, and shortstops, with six winners each, won the most among infielders, followed by third basemen (4). Four catchers and two pitchers won the award.

Eight players who won the Rookie of the Year Award also won the American Association Most Valuable Player Award in the same season: Jerry Witte (1946), Herb Score (1954), Jack Smith (1962), Barry Larkin (1986), Lance Johnson (1987), Juan González (1990), Eric Owens (1995), and Magglio Ordóñez (1997).

Seven players from the Denver Zephyrs and Indianapolis Indians were each selected for the Rookie of the Year Award, more than any other teams in the league, followed by the Milwaukee Brewers, Omaha Royals, Tulsa Oilers, and Wichita Aeros (3); the Iowa Cubs, Kansas City Blues, Louisville Redbirds, Nashville Sounds, Oklahoma City 89ers, Springfield Redbirds, and St. Paul Saints (2); and the Buffalo Bisons, Louisville Colonels, Minneapolis Millers, Omaha Cardinals, Omaha Dodgers, and Toledo Mud Hens (1).

Eight players from the St. Louis Cardinals Major League Baseball (MLB) organization won the award, more than any other, followed by the Chicago White Sox and Cincinnati Reds organizations (5); the Milwaukee Braves organization (4); the Cleveland Indians, Kansas City Royals, Los Angeles Dodgers, Montreal Expos, and New York Yankees organizations (3); the Baltimore Orioles, Chicago Cubs, and Texas Rangers organizations (2); and the Boston Red Sox, Milwaukee Brewers, and Pittsburgh Pirates organizations (1).

== Winners ==
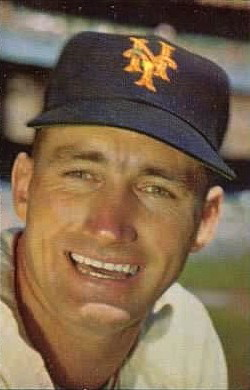
Alvin Dark, the 1947 Rookie of the Year, won the 1948 MLB Rookie of the Year Award.

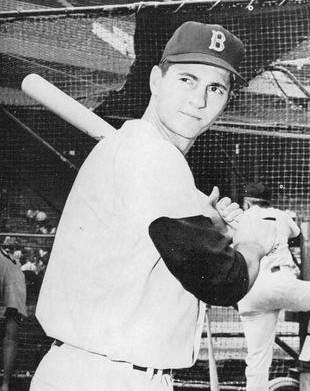
Carl Yastrzemski, who won in 1960, was inducted into the Baseball Hall of Fame in 1989.

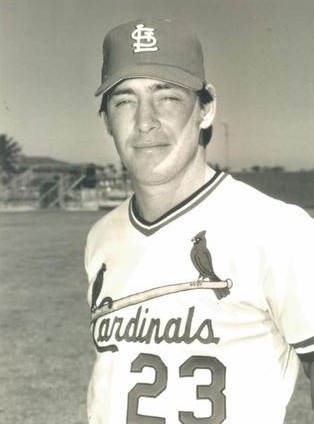
Carl Yastrzemski, the 1969 winner, was inducted into the Baseball Hall of Fame in 2020.

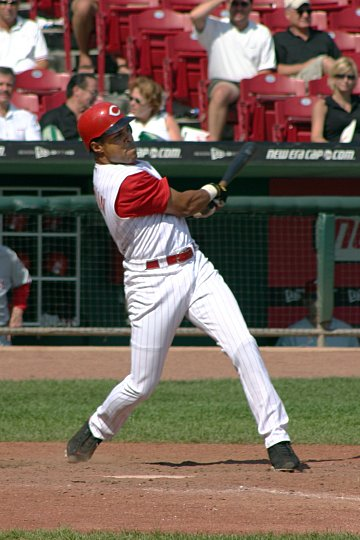
Barry Larkin, who won in 1986, was inducted into the Baseball Hall of Fame in 2012.

Key
| Position | Indicates the player's primary position |

Winners
| Year | Winner | Team | Organization | Position | Ref. |
|---|---|---|---|---|---|
| 1946 | Jerry Witte | Toledo Mud Hens | St. Louis Browns | First baseman | |
| 1947 | Alvin Dark | Milwaukee Brewers | Boston Braves | Shortstop | |
| 1948 | Al Rosen | Kansas City Blues | New York Yankees | Third baseman | |
| 1949 | Roy Hartsfield | Milwaukee Brewers | Boston Braves | Second baseman | |
| 1950 | Lou Limmer | St. Paul Saints | Brooklyn Dodgers | First baseman | |
| 1951 | George Crowe | Milwaukee Brewers | Boston Braves | First baseman | |
| 1952 | Bill Skowron | Kansas City Blues | New York Yankees | Outfielder | |
| 1953 | Don Zimmer | St. Paul Saints | Brooklyn Dodgers | Shortstop | |
| 1954 | Herb Score | Indianapolis Indians | Cleveland Indians | Pitcher | |
| 1955 | Don Blasingame | Omaha Cardinals | St. Louis Cardinals | Second baseman | |
| 1956 | Tony Kubek | Denver Bears | New York Yankees | Shortstop | |
| 1957 | Ray Shearer | Wichita Braves | Milwaukee Braves | Outfielder | |
| 1958 | Willie Tasby | Louisville Colonels | Baltimore Orioles | Outfielder | |
| 1959 | Cam Carreon | Indianapolis Indians | Chicago White Sox | Catcher | |
| 1960 | Carl Yastrzemski | Minneapolis Millers | Boston Red Sox | Outfielder | |
| 1961 | Chico Ruiz | Indianapolis Indians | Cincinnati Reds | Shortstop | |
| 1962 | Jack Smith | Omaha Dodgers | Los Angeles Dodgers | Pitcher | |
| 1969 | Ted Simmons | Tulsa Oilers | St. Louis Cardinals | Catcher | |
| 1970 | Chris Chambliss | Wichita Aeros | Cleveland Indians | Outfielder | |
| 1971 | Buddy Bell | Wichita Aeros | Cleveland Indians | Third baseman | |
| 1972 | Jim Wohlford | Omaha Royals | Kansas City Royals | Second baseman | |
| 1973 | Ken Griffey Sr. | Indianapolis Indians | Cincinnati Reds | Outfielder | |
| 1974 | Marc Hill | Tulsa Oilers | St. Louis Cardinals | Catcher | |
| 1975 | Manny Estrada | Denver Bears | Chicago White Sox | Second baseman | |
| 1976 | Garry Templeton | Tulsa Oilers | St. Louis Cardinals | Shortstop | |
| 1977 | Clint Hurdle | Omaha Royals | Kansas City Royals | Outfielder | |
| 1978 | Jim Lentine | Springfield Redbirds | St. Louis Cardinals | Outfielder | |
| 1979 | Leon Durham | Springfield Redbirds | St. Louis Cardinals | Outfielder | |
| 1980 | Tim Raines | Denver Bears | Montreal Expos | Second baseman | |
| 1981 | Terry Francona | Denver Bears | Montreal Expos | Outfielder | |
| 1982 | Mel Hall | Iowa Cubs | Chicago Cubs | Outfielder | |
| 1983 | Joe Carter | Iowa Cubs | Chicago Cubs | Outfielder | |
| 1984 | Daryl Boston | Denver Zephyrs | Chicago White Sox | Outfielder | |
| 1985 | Andrés Galarraga | Indianapolis Indians | Montreal Expos | First baseman | |
| 1986 | Barry Larkin | Denver Zephyrs | Cincinnati Reds | Shortstop | |
| 1987 | Lance Johnson | Louisville Redbirds | St. Louis Cardinals | Outfielder | |
| 1988 | LaVel Freeman | Denver Zephyrs | Milwaukee Brewers | Outfielder | |
| 1989 | Todd Zeile | Louisville Redbirds | St. Louis Cardinals | Catcher | |
| 1990 | Juan González | Oklahoma City 89ers | Texas Rangers | Outfielder | |
| 1991 | Rob Maurer | Oklahoma City 89ers | Texas Rangers | First baseman | |
| 1992 | Kevin Young | Buffalo Bisons | Pittsburgh Pirates | Third baseman | |
| 1993 | Willie Greene | Indianapolis Indians | Cincinnati Reds | Third baseman | |
| 1994 | Joe Vitiello | Omaha Royals | Kansas City Royals | First baseman | |
| 1995 | Eric Owens | Indianapolis Indians | Cincinnati Reds | Second baseman | |
| 1996 | Jeff Abbott | Nashville Sounds | Chicago White Sox | Outfielder | |
| 1997 | Magglio Ordóñez | Nashville Sounds | Chicago White Sox | Outfielder | |

== Wins by team ==
| Team | Award(s) | Year(s) |
|---|---|---|
| Denver Zephyrs (Denver Bears) | 7 | 1956, 1975, 1980, 1981, 1984, 1986, 1988 |
| Indianapolis Indians | 7 | 1954, 1959, 1961, 1973, 1985, 1993, 1995 |
| Milwaukee Brewers | 3 | 1947, 1949, 1951 |
| Omaha Royals | 3 | 1972, 1977, 1994 |
| Tulsa Oilers | 3 | 1969, 1974, 1976 |
| Wichita Aeros (Wichita Aeros) | 3 | 1957, 1970, 1971 |
| Iowa Cubs | 2 | 1982, 1983 |
| Kansas City Blues | 2 | 1948, 1952 |
| Louisville Redbirds | 2 | 1987, 1989 |
| Nashville Sounds | 2 | 1996, 1997 |
| Oklahoma City 89ers | 2 | 1990, 1991 |
| Springfield Redbirds | 2 | 1978, 1979 |
| St. Paul Saints | 2 | 1950, 1953 |
| Buffalo Bisons | 1 | 1992 |
| Louisville Colonels | 1 | 1958 |
| Minneapolis Millers | 1 | 1960 |
| Omaha Cardinals | 1 | 1955 |
| Omaha Dodgers | 1 | 1962 |
| Toledo Mud Hens | 1 | 1946 |

== Wins by organization ==
| Organization | Award(s) | Year(s) |
|---|---|---|
| St. Louis Cardinals | 8 | 1955, 1969, 1974, 1976, 1978, 1979, 1987, 1989 |
| Chicago White Sox | 5 | 1959, 1975, 1984, 1996, 1997 |
| Cincinnati Reds | 5 | 1961, 1973, 1986, 1993, 1995 |
| Milwaukee Braves (Boston Braves) | 4 | 1947, 1949, 1951, 1957 |
| Cleveland Indians | 3 | 1954, 1970, 1971 |
| Kansas City Royals | 3 | 1972, 1977, 1994 |
| Los Angeles Dodgers (Brooklyn Dodgers) | 3 | 1950, 1953, 1962 |
| Montreal Expos | 3 | 1980, 1981, 1985 |
| New York Yankees | 3 | 1948, 1952, 1956 |
| Baltimore Orioles (St. Louis Browns) | 2 | 1946, 1958 |
| Chicago Cubs | 2 | 1982, 1983 |
| Texas Rangers | 2 | 1990, 1991 |
| Boston Red Sox | 1 | 1960 |
| Milwaukee Brewers | 1 | 1988 |
| Pittsburgh Pirates | 1 | 1992 |
