= American Association (1902–1997) Most Valuable Player Award =

American Association Most Valuable Player Award
- Sport: Baseball
- League: American Association
- Awarded for: Regular-season most valuable player of the American Association
- Country: United States
- Presented by: American Association

History
- First award: Billy Rogell (1929)
- Final award: Magglio Ordóñez (1997)

The American Association Most Valuable Player Award (MVP) was an annual award given to the best player in Minor League Baseball's American Association based on their regular-season performance. Though the league was established in 1902, the award was not created until 1929. It continued to be issued through the 1962 season, after which the league disbanded. In 1969, both the league and the award were revived, and the honor continued to be given until the league disbanded for a second time after the 1997 season.

First basemen, with 18 winners, won the most among infielders and all positions, followed by third baseman (10), shortstops (7), and second basemen (3). Fifteen winners were outfielders. Seven pitchers and three catchers won the award.

Eight players who won the MVP Award also won the American Association Rookie of the Year Award in the same season: Jerry Witte (1946), Herb Score (1954), Jack Smith (1962), Barry Larkin (1986), Lance Johnson (1987), Juan González (1990), Eric Owens (1995), and Magglio Ordóñez (1997). From 1929 to 1962, pitchers were eligible to win the MVP Award as no award was designated for pitchers. In 1969, the American Association established a Most Valuable Pitcher Award. No player won both awards.

Eleven players from the Denver Zephyrs were selected for the MVP Award, more than any other team in the league, followed by the Indianapolis Indians (9); the Minneapolis Millers and Wichita Aeros (6); the Milwaukee Brewers and Omaha Royals (4); the Oklahoma City 89ers and St. Paul Saints (3); the Columbus Red Birds, Kansas City Blues, Louisville Colonels, and Toledo Mud Hens (2); and the Charleston Senators, Fort Worth Cats, Iowa Cubs, Louisville Redbirds, Nashville Sounds, Omaha Dodgers, Toledo Sox, Tulsa Oilers, and Wichita Braves (1).

Six players from the Chicago Cubs and Cincinnati Reds Major League Baseball (MLB) organizations each won the award, more than any others, followed by the Montreal Expos organization (5); the Milwaukee Braves, Kansas City Royals, St. Louis Cardinals, and Texas Rangers organizations (4); the Chicago White Sox, Detroit Tigers, Milwaukee Brewers, New York Giants, and New York Yankees organizations (3); the Boston Red Sox, Cleveland Indians, Pittsburgh Pirates, and St. Louis Browns organizations (2); and the Houston Astros and Los Angeles Dodgers organizations (1). Five award winners played for teams that were not affiliated with any MLB organization.

== Winners ==
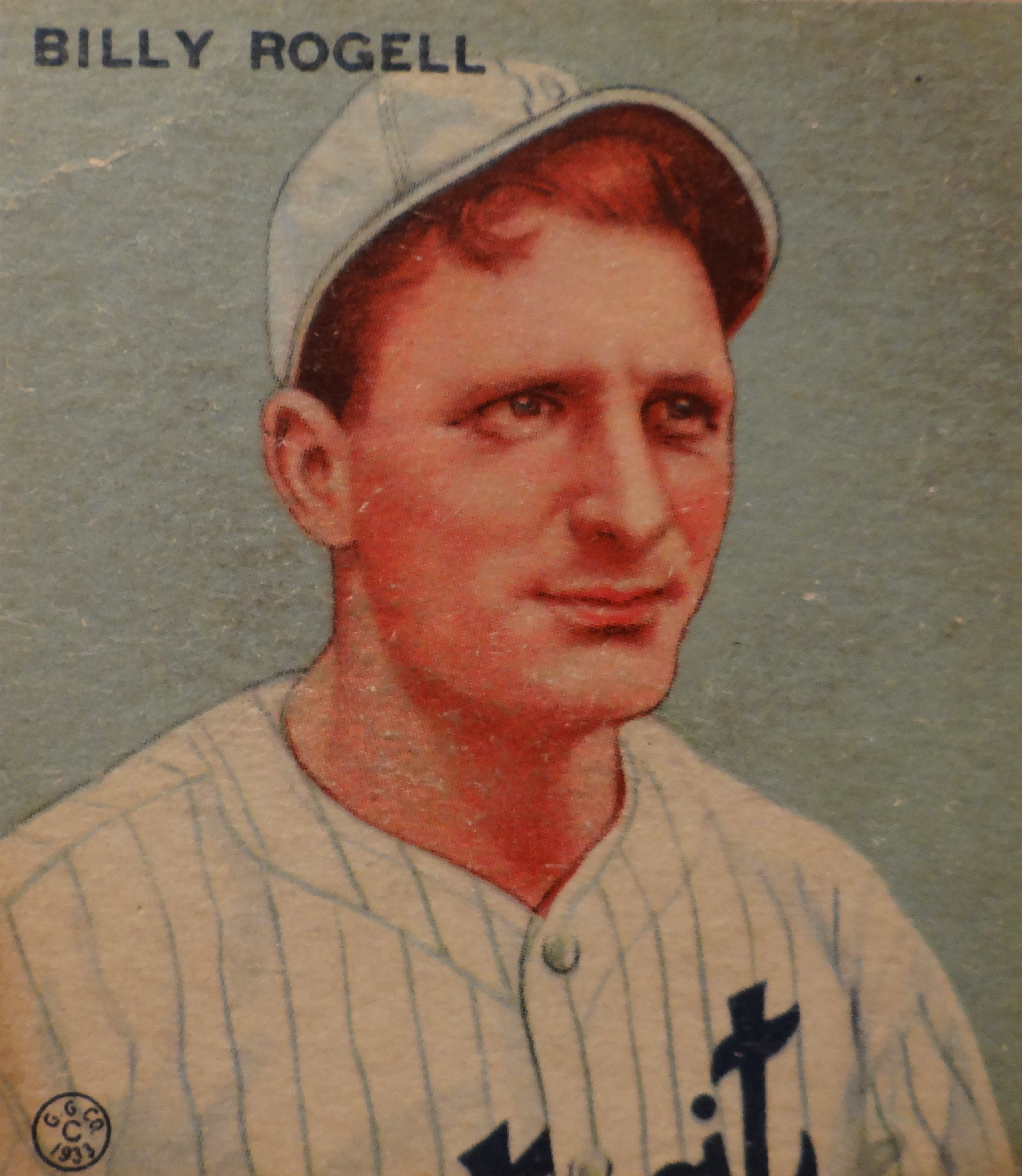
Billy Rogell won the first American Association Most Valuable Player Award in 1929.

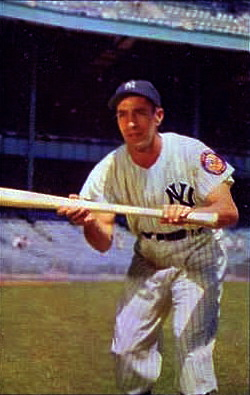
Phil Rizzuto, the 1940 MVP, was the 1950 American League MVP.

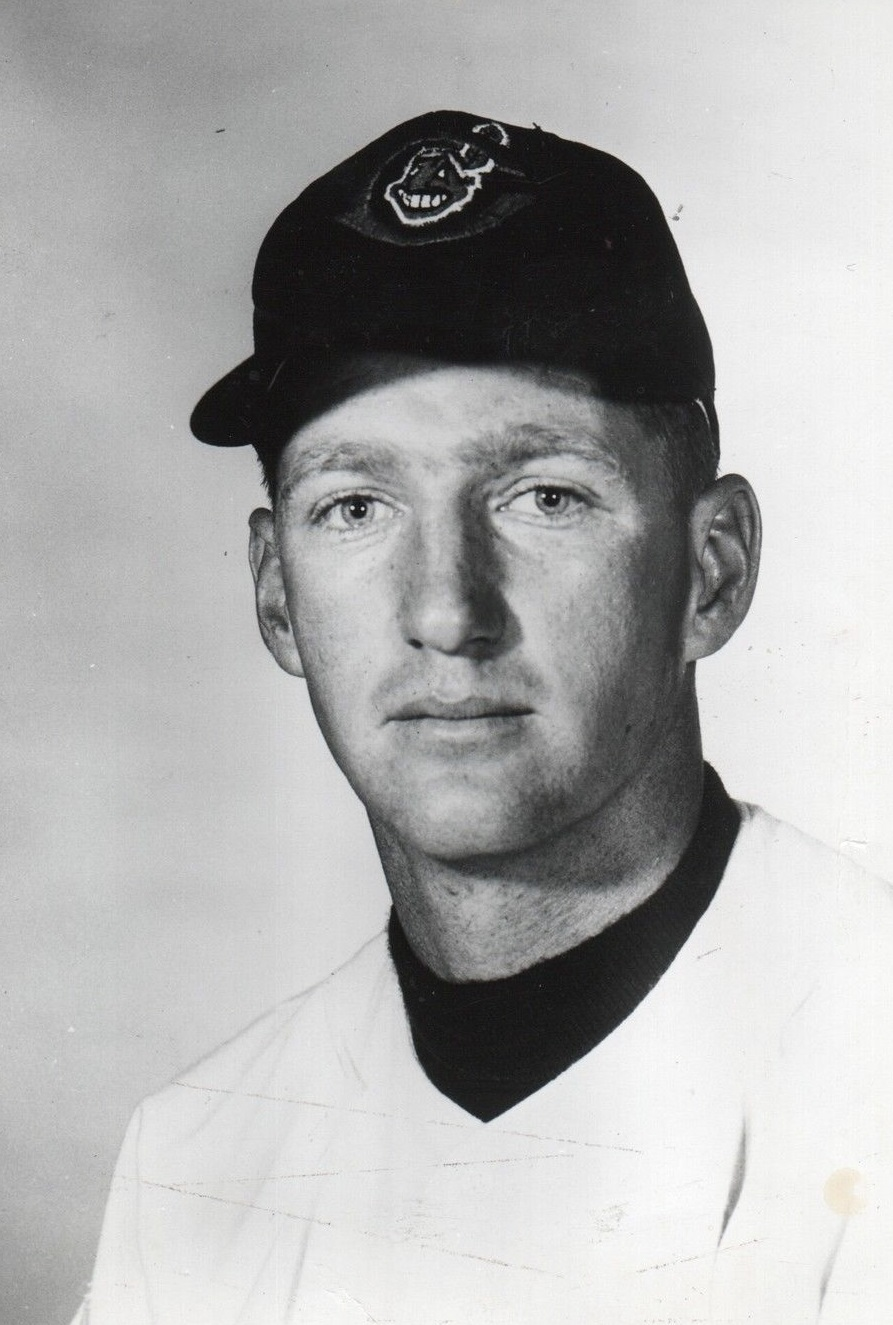
Herb Score, winner in 1954, was selected as the American League Rookie of the Year the next season.

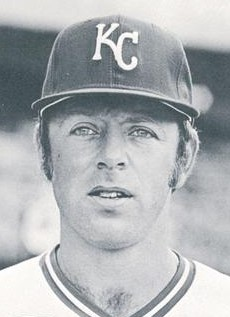
Richie Scheinblum, the 1971 Most Valuable Player, was chosen as an MLB All-Star in 1972.

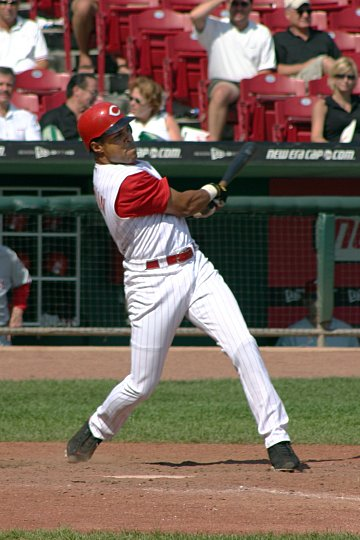
Barry Larkin, who won in 1986, was the 1995 National League MVP and was inducted into the Baseball Hall of Fame in 2012.

Key
| Position | Indicates the player's primary position |
| ^ | Indicates multiple award winners in the same year |

| Year | Winner | Team | Organization | Position | Ref. |
|---|---|---|---|---|---|
| 1929 | Billy Rogell | St. Paul Saints | — | Shortstop | |
| 1930 | Joe Olivares | Louisville Colonels | — | Shortstop | |
| 1931 | None selected | | | | |
| 1932 | Pat Crawford | Columbus Red Birds | St. Louis Cardinals | First baseman | |
| 1933 | Joe Hauser | Minneapolis Millers | — | First baseman | |
| 1934 | Pinky Hargrave | Minneapolis Millers | — | Catcher | |
| 1935 | Mike Ryba | Columbus Red Birds | St. Louis Cardinals | Pitcher | |
| 1936 | Rudy York | Milwaukee Brewers | Detroit Tigers | First baseman | |
| 1937 | Red Kress | Minneapolis Millers | Boston Red Sox | Shortstop | |
| 1938^ | Ollie Bejma | St. Paul Saints | Chicago White Sox | Second baseman | |
| 1938^ | Whit Wyatt | Milwaukee Brewers | Cleveland Indians | Pitcher | |
| 1939 | Gil English | St. Paul Saints | Chicago White Sox | Third baseman | |
| 1940 | Phil Rizzuto | Kansas City Blues | New York Yankees | Shortstop | |
| 1941 | Johnny Pesky | Louisville Colonels | Boston Red Sox | Shortstop | |
| 1942 | Eddie Stanky | Milwaukee Brewers | Chicago Cubs | Shortstop | |
| 1943 | Stew Hofferth | Indianapolis Indians | — | Catcher | |
| 1944 | Babe Martin | Toledo Mud Hens | St. Louis Browns | Outfielder | |
| 1945 | Stan Wentzel | Indianapolis Indians | Boston Braves | Outfielder | |
| 1946 | Jerry Witte | Toledo Mud Hens | St. Louis Browns | First baseman | |
| 1947 | Steve Gerkin | Minneapolis Millers | New York Giants | Pitcher | |
| 1948 | Les Fleming | Indianapolis Indians | Pittsburgh Pirates | First baseman | |
| 1949 | Nanny Fernandez | Indianapolis Indians | Pittsburgh Pirates | Third baseman | |
| 1950 | Ray Dandridge | Minneapolis Millers | New York Giants | Third baseman | |
| 1951 | Al Unser | Milwaukee Brewers | Boston Braves | Catcher | |
| 1952 | Don Bollweg | Kansas City Blues | New York Yankees | First baseman | |
| 1953 | Gene Conley | Toledo Sox | Milwaukee Braves | Pitcher | |
| 1954 | Herb Score | Indianapolis Indians | Cleveland Indians | Pitcher | |
| 1955 | Rance Pless | Minneapolis Millers | New York Giants | Third baseman | |
| 1956 | Marv Throneberry | Denver Bears | New York Yankees | First baseman | |
| 1957 | Carl Willey | Wichita Braves | Milwaukee Braves | Pitcher | |
| 1958 | Wayne Terwilliger | Charleston Senators | Detroit Tigers | Second baseman | |
| 1959 | Bob Will | Fort Worth Cats | Chicago Cubs | Outfielder | |
| 1960 | Steve Boros | Denver Bears | Detroit Tigers | Third baseman | |
| 1961 | Cliff Cook | Indianapolis Indians | Cincinnati Reds | Third baseman | |
| 1962 | Jack Smith | Omaha Dodgers | Los Angeles Dodgers | Pitcher | |
| 1969 | Bernie Carbo | Indianapolis Indians | Cincinnati Reds | Outfielder | |
| 1970 | George Spriggs | Omaha Royals | Kansas City Royals | Outfielder | |
| 1971 | Richie Scheinblum | Denver Bears | Washington Senators | Outfielder | |
| 1972 | Pat Bourque | Wichita Aeros | Chicago Cubs | First baseman | |
| 1973 | Cliff Johnson | Denver Bears | Houston Astros | First baseman | |
| 1974 | Pete LaCock | Wichita Aeros | Chicago Cubs | First baseman | |
| 1975 | Héctor Cruz | Tulsa Oilers | St. Louis Cardinals | Third baseman | |
| 1976 | Roger Freed | Denver Bears | Montreal Expos | First baseman | |
| 1977 | Frank Ortenzio | Denver Bears | Montreal Expos | First baseman | |
| 1978 | Champ Summers | Indianapolis Indians | Cincinnati Reds | Outfielder | |
| 1979 | Karl Pagel | Wichita Aeros | Chicago Cubs | Outfielder | |
| 1980 | Randy Bass | Denver Bears | Montreal Expos | First baseman | |
| 1981 | Manny Castillo | Omaha Royals | Kansas City Royals | Third baseman | |
| 1982 | Ken Phelps | Wichita Aeros | Montreal Expos | First baseman | |
| 1983 | Mike Stenhouse | Wichita Aeros | Montreal Expos | First baseman | |
| 1984 | Alan Knicely | Wichita Aeros | Cincinnati Reds | First baseman | |
| 1985 | Steve Buechele | Oklahoma City 89ers | Texas Rangers | Third baseman | |
| 1986 | Barry Larkin | Denver Zephyrs | Cincinnati Reds | Shortstop | |
| 1987 | Lance Johnson | Louisville Redbirds | St. Louis Cardinals | Outfielder | |
| 1988 | Luis de los Santos | Omaha Royals | Kansas City Royals | First baseman | |
| 1989 | Greg Vaughn | Denver Zephyrs | Milwaukee Brewers | Outfielder | |
| 1990 | Juan González | Oklahoma City 89ers | Texas Rangers | Outfielder | |
| 1991 | Jim Olander | Denver Zephyrs | Milwaukee Brewers | Outfielder | |
| 1992 | Jim Tatum | Denver Zephyrs | Milwaukee Brewers | Third baseman | |
| 1993 | Eduardo Zambrano | Iowa Cubs | Chicago Cubs | Outfielder | |
| 1994 | Dwayne Hosey | Omaha Royals | Kansas City Royals | Outfielder | |
| 1995 | Eric Owens | Indianapolis Indians | Cincinnati Reds | Second baseman | |
| 1996 | Lee Stevens | Oklahoma City 89ers | Texas Rangers | First baseman | |
| 1997 | Magglio Ordóñez | Nashville Sounds | Chicago White Sox | Outfielder | |

== Wins by team ==
| Team | Award(s) | Year(s) |
|---|---|---|
| Denver Zephyrs (Denver Bears) | 11 | 1956, 1960, 1971, 1973, 1976, 1977, 1980, 1986, 1989, 1991, 1992 |
| Indianapolis Indians | 9 | 1943, 1945, 1948, 1949, 1954, 1961, 1969, 1978, 1995 |
| Minneapolis Millers | 6 | 1933, 1934, 1937, 1947, 1950, 1955 |
| Wichita Aeros | 6 | 1972, 1974, 1979, 1982, 1983, 1984 |
| Milwaukee Brewers | 4 | 1936, 1938, 1942, 1951 |
| Omaha Royals | 4 | 1970, 1981, 1988, 1994 |
| Oklahoma City 89ers | 3 | 1985, 1990, 1996 |
| St. Paul Saints | 3 | 1929, 1938, 1939 |
| Columbus Red Birds | 2 | 1932, 1935 |
| Kansas City Blues | 2 | 1940, 1952 |
| Louisville Colonels | 2 | 1930, 1941 |
| Toledo Mud Hens | 2 | 1944, 1946 |
| Charleston Senators | 1 | 1958 |
| Fort Worth Cats | 1 | 1959 |
| Iowa Cubs | 1 | 1993 |
| Louisville Redbirds | 1 | 1987 |
| Nashville Sounds | 1 | 1997 |
| Omaha Dodgers | 1 | 1962 |
| Toledo Sox | 1 | 1953 |
| Tulsa Oilers | 1 | 1975 |
| Wichita Braves | 1 | 1957 |

== Wins by organization ==
| Organization | Award(s) | Year(s) |
|---|---|---|
| Chicago Cubs | 6 | 1942, 1959, 1972, 1974, 1979, 1993 |
| Cincinnati Reds | 6 | 1961, 1969, 1978, 1984, 1986, 1995 |
| Montreal Expos | 5 | 1976, 1977, 1980, 1982, 1983 |
| Milwaukee Braves (Boston Braves) | 4 | 1945, 1951, 1953, 1957 |
| Kansas City Royals | 4 | 1970, 1981, 1988, 1994 |
| St. Louis Cardinals | 4 | 1932, 1935, 1975, 1987 |
| Texas Rangers (Washington Senators) | 4 | 1971, 1985, 1990, 1996 |
| Chicago White Sox | 3 | 1938, 1939, 1997 |
| Detroit Tigers | 3 | 1936, 1958, 1960 |
| Milwaukee Brewers | 3 | 1989, 1991, 1992 |
| New York Giants | 3 | 1947, 1950, 1955 |
| New York Yankees | 3 | 1940, 1952, 1956 |
| Boston Red Sox | 2 | 1937, 1941 |
| Cleveland Indians | 2 | 1938, 1954 |
| Pittsburgh Pirates | 2 | 1948, 1949 |
| St. Louis Browns | 2 | 1944, 1946 |
| Houston Astros | 1 | 1973 |
| Los Angeles Dodgers | 1 | 1962 |
