= Iowa Cubs =

- Founded in 1969; Des Moines, Iowa

Team logo	Cap insignia

Minor league affiliations
- Class: Triple-A (1969–present)
- League: International League (2021–present)
- Division: West Division
- Previous leagues: Pacific Coast League (1998–2020); American Association (1969–1997)

Major league affiliations
- Team: Chicago Cubs (1981–present)
- Previous teams: Chicago White Sox (1976–1980); Houston Astros (1975); Chicago White Sox (1973–1974); Oakland Athletics (1969–1972)

Minor league titles
- League titles (1): 1993
- Conference titles (1): 2004
- Division titles (8): 1973; 1993; 1997; 1998; 2001; 2004; 2008; 2019

Team data
- Name: Iowa Cubs (1982–present)
- Previous names: Iowa Oaks (1969–1981)
- Colors: Blue, red, white
- Mascot: Cubbie Bear
- Ballpark: Principal Park (1992–present)
- Previous parks: Sec Taylor Stadium (1969–1991)
- Owner/ Operator: Diamond Baseball Holdings
- General manager: Sam Bernabe
- Manager: Marty Pevey
- Website: milb.com/iowa

The Iowa Cubs are a Minor League Baseball team of the International League and the Triple-A affiliate of the Chicago Cubs. They are located in Des Moines, Iowa, and are named for their Major League Baseball (MLB) affiliate. The Cubs have played their home games at Principal Park since 1992, replacing Sec Taylor Stadium which the Cubs used from 1969 to 1991.

The club was established as the Iowa Oaks of the Triple-A American Association in 1969. Iowa took on the Cubs moniker in 1982. They joined the Triple-A Pacific Coast League in 1998 following the dissolution of the American Association after the 1997 season. In conjunction with MLB's reorganization of Minor League Baseball in 2021, the Cubs were shifted to the Triple-A East, which was renamed the International League in 2022.

The only league title in franchise history is the 1993 American Association championship.

== History ==
=== American Association (1969–1997) ===
Triple-A Minor League Baseball came to Iowa's capital city in 1969, as the Iowa Oaks of the American Association (AA) began play as an affiliate of the Oakland Athletics. They played their home games at Sec Taylor Stadium, which opened in 1947 and was located at the confluence of the Des Moines and Raccoon Rivers. Many future Major League Baseball stars such as sluggers Bill McNulty, Hall of Famer Harold Baines, Pat Tabler, and 1971 Cy Young and MVP Award winning left-handed pitcher Vida Blue spent time with the Oaks. Both Bucky Dent and future Hall-of-Famer Goose Gossage played for the Oaks early in their careers. The A's farm club experienced winning seasons in 1970 and 1971, but third and second-place finishes kept them out of the playoffs.

The Oaks became the top affiliate of the Chicago White Sox in 1973. They won the East Division that season with an 83–53 record, earning a spot in the best-of-seven American Association championship playoffs, but they were defeated by the Tulsa Oilers, 4–3. Manager Joe Sparks won the American Association Manager of the Year Award. Oaks pitchers tossed two no-hitters in 1974, both in away games. The first was pitched by Joe Henderson against the Wichita Aeros on July 31. The second occurred on August 25 when Butch Stinson no-hit the Indianapolis Indians.

After one season as the Houston Astros' Triple-A club in 1975, Iowa returned to the White Sox organization in 1976. Despite a number of winning seasons, they failed to qualify for the postseason during the five years of their second affiliation with Chicago. On September 1, 1977, Chris Knapp and Fred Howard combined to no-hit the Omaha Royals. On May 26, 1978, Jack Kucek tossed a no-hitter at Sec Taylor Stadium against the Oklahoma City 89ers. The franchise was awarded the 1978 John H. Johnson President's Award, recognizing them as the "complete baseball franchise—based on franchise stability, contributions to league stability, contributions to baseball in the community, and promotion of the baseball industry." Former St. Louis Cardinals manager Tony La Russa managed the Iowa Oaks in 1979 prior to becoming manager of the White Sox. Pitcher Dewey Robinson was selected for the 1979 American Association Most Valuable Pitcher Award after achieving a record of 13–7 and 9 saves with a 2.93 earned run average (ERA) and 76 strikeouts.

In 1981, the team affiliated with the Chicago Cubs. After a final season as the Oaks, they adopted the nickname of their parent team in 1982 becoming the Iowa Cubs. The name is often shortened to "I-Cubs" to avoid confusion with the major league team. Iowa teams of the 1980s often finished high in the standings but were unable to qualify for the championship playoffs, the only exceptions being in 1983 and 1984 when they earned spots in the semi-finals but were eliminated by Denver both years.

Members of the 1982 team garnered several league awards. Jay Howell, who struck out 139 batters on the way to a 13–4 record and a 2.36 ERA, won the AA Most Valuable Pitcher Award. Skipper Jim Napier was the league's Manager of the Year. Outfielder Mel Hall was the Rookie of the Year after accruing a batting average of .329 while hitting 34 doubles and 32 home runs and driving in 125 runs. Another Cub outfielder, Joe Carter, won the 1983 Rookie of the Year Award after stealing 40 bases and hitting .307 with 22 homers. In 1984, Reggie Patterson fired a no-hitter against the Omaha Royals on August 21. The club was given the 1986 Larry MacPhail Award in rocognition of their marketing and promotion efforts.

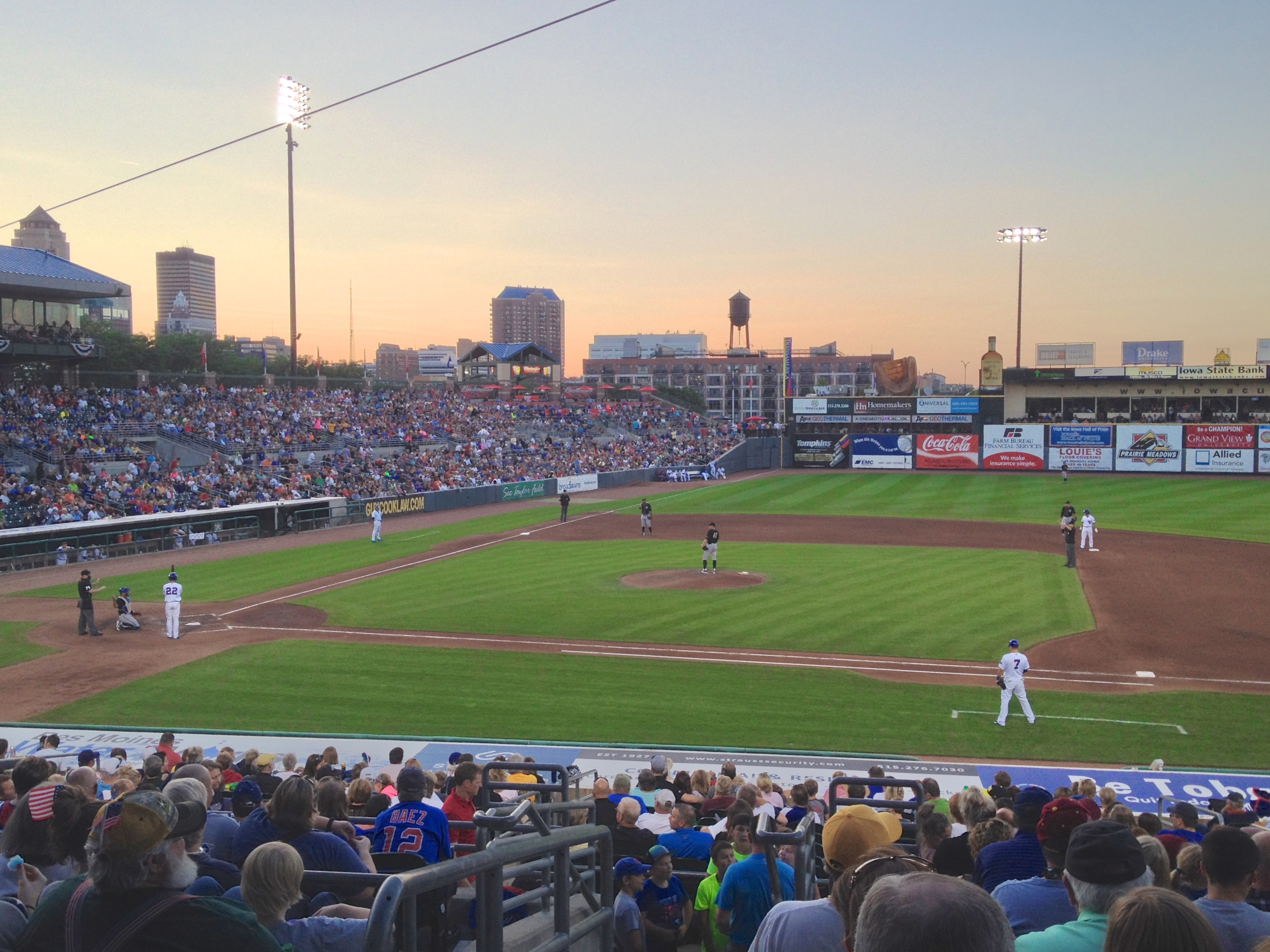
The Cubs have played their home games at Principal Park since 1992.

Sec Taylor Stadium was demolished after the 1991 season, and a new facility of the same name, later renamed Principal Park, was constructed on the site in time for the Cubs' 1992 season.

Following a dismal 1992 campaign in which the Cubs went 51–92, they rebounded to win the 1993 Western Division title at 85–59 under manager Marv Foley. They met the Nashville Sounds in the best-of-seven championship series. Leading the series 3–1, the Cubs lost two consecutive games and were forced to a game seven. In the final game, Nashville held a 2–1 lead from the third inning to the seventh before the Cubs tied the game necessitating extra innings. An eleventh-inning walk-off home run by Iowa's Tuffy Rhodes ended the game and gave the Cubs their first league title. Outfielder Eduardo Zambrano garnered the American Association Most Valuable Player Award after collecting 115 RBI and hitting 32 home runs with a .303 average. Iowa did not reach the playoffs again until 1997. They captured the Western Division title with a 74–69 record before defeating the New Orleans Zephyrs in the semi-finals. They were swept by the Buffalo Bisons, 3–0, in the championship round.

=== Pacific Coast League (1998–2020) ===
The American Association, of which the Cubs had been members since their inaugural 1969 campaign, disbanded after the 1997 season. Its teams were absorbed by the two remaining Triple-A leagues—the International League and Pacific Coast League (PCL). The Cubs joined the PCL and won the American Conference Central Division title in 1998 with an 85–59 record. In the American Conference series, they were bested by the New Orleans Zephyrs, 2–1, in a rain-shortened series. Manager Terry Kennedy won the PCL Manager of the Year Award. Former Chicago Cubs manager and Iowa native Bruce Kimm managed the I-Cubs from 2001 to 2002. He led them to the 2001 division title (83–60), but they were again eliminated by New Orleans in the conference series. The Cubs won their second John H. Johnson President's Award in 2002.

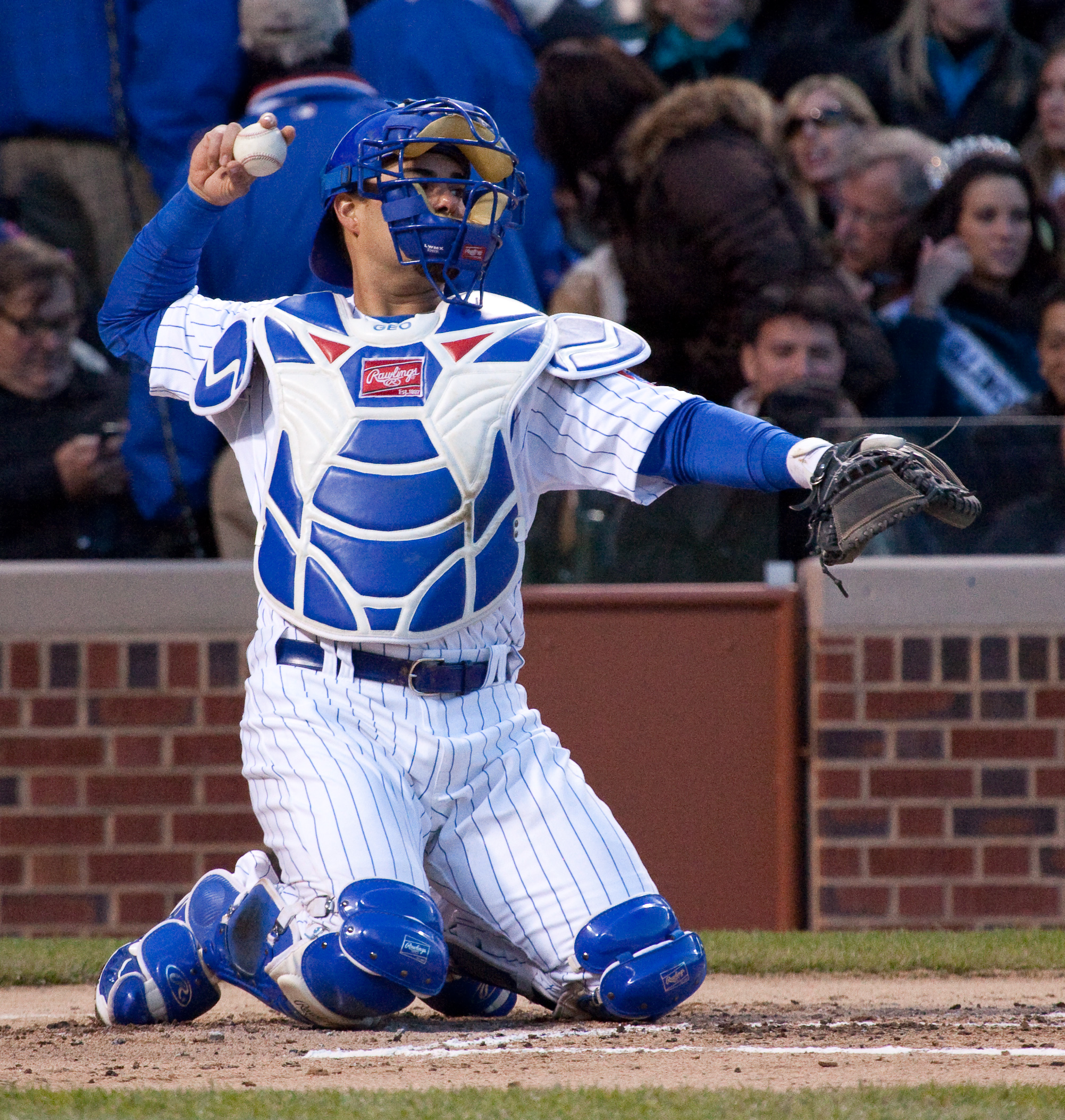
Geovany Soto won the 2007 PCL Most Valuable Player Award.

Mike Quade, former manager of the Chicago Cubs, managed Iowa from 2003 to 2006. The Cubs ended the 2004 season at 79–64 giving them another division title. This time, they defeated the Oklahoma RedHawks, 3–2, to win the American Conference championship. In the best-of-five Pacific Coast League championship series, they lost to the Sacramento River Cats, 3–0. In 2007, catcher Geovany Soto, with a .353 average, 26 home runs, and 109 RBI, won the PCL Most Valuable Player Award. Led by PCL Manager of the Year Pat Listach, the 2008 Cubs won the American Conference Northern Division (83–59), but were beaten in the conference series by Oklahoma, 3–2.

In 2010, the team was managed by Baseball Hall of Fame inductee Ryne Sandberg who was also selected as the league's Manager of the Year. First baseman Bryan LaHair won the 2010 PCL MVP Award with his .331 average, 38 homers, and 109 RBI. On May 7, 2014, Iowa starter Chris Rusin pitched a no-hitter against the New Orleans Zephyrs. In 2015, right-hander Carlos Pimentel won the PCL Pitcher of the Year Award after achieving a 12–6 record with 118 strikeouts and a 2.95 ERA. The Cubs returned to the postseason in 2019 having won the division with a 75–65 record, but they were eliminated by the Round Rock Express in the American Conference series. Colin Rea, who paced the league with 14 wins, was recognized as the PCL Pitcher of the Year.

The start of the 2020 season was postponed due to the COVID-19 pandemic, before the whole season was cancelled on June 30.

=== Triple-A East / International League (2021–present) ===
Following the 2020 season, Major League Baseball assumed control of Minor League Baseball in a move to increase player salaries, modernize facility standards, and reduce travel. The Chicago Cubs retained Iowa as their Triple-A affiliate, but the Pacific Coast League disbanded, and the Cubs were placed in the Triple-A East. Iowa began competition in the new league on May 4 with a 3–0 loss to the Indianapolis Indians at Principal Park. On May 9, the Cubs tossed the league's first no-hitter when Shelby Miller, Tommy Nance, Brad Wieck, and Ryan Meisinger combined to no-hit Indianapolis, 2–0, in Des Moines. Pitchers Justin Steele, Scott Effross, and Dillon Maples threw the league's second no-hitter in the first game of a seven-inning doubleheader against the St. Paul Saints on July 11, a 1–0 home win. Iowa ended the season in seventh place in the Midwestern Division with a 50–70 record. No playoffs were held to determine a league champion; instead, the team with the best regular-season record was declared the winner. However, 10 games that had been postponed from the start of the season were reinserted into the schedule as a postseason tournament called the Triple-A Final Stretch in which all 30 Triple-A clubs competed for the highest winning percentage. Iowa finished the tournament in 29th place with a 1–8 record. In December 2021, owner Michael Gartner announced that the team had been sold to Endeavor. In 2022, the Triple-A East became known as the International League, the name historically used by the regional circuit prior to the 2021 reorganization.

== Season-by-season records ==
Table key
League	The team's final position in the league standings
Division	The team's final position in the divisional standings
GB	Games behind the team that finished in first place in the division that season
‡	Class champions (1970–present)
†	League champions (1969–present)
§	Conference champions (1998–2020)
*	Division champions (1970–2022)
^	Postseason berth (1981–present)

Season-by-season records
Season	League	Regular-season					Postseason			MLB affiliate	Ref.
Season	League	Record	Win %	League	Division	GB	Record	Win %	Result	MLB affiliate	Ref.
1969	AA	62–78	.443	4th (tie)	—	23	—	—	Result	—	Oakland Athletics
1970	AA	70–68	.507	2nd (tie)	2nd (tie)	3	—	—	—	Oakland Athletics	
1971	AA	71–69	.507	3rd (tie)	2nd	13 1/2	—	—	—	Oakland Athletics	
1972	AA	62–78	.443	5th	3rd	21	—	—	—	Oakland Athletics	
1973 *	AA	83–53	.610	1st	1st	—	3–4	.429	Won Eastern Division title Lost AA championship vs. Tulsa Oilers, 4–3	Chicago White Sox	
1974	AA	74–62	.544	3rd	2nd	4 1/2	—	—	—	Chicago White Sox	
1975	AA	56–79	.415	7th	4th	20 1/2	—	—	—	Houston Astros	
1976	AA	68–68	.500	4th	2nd	10	—	—	—	Chicago White Sox	
1977	AA	61–75	.449	7th	4th	15 1/2	—	—	—	Chicago White Sox	
1978	AA	66–70	.485	5th	4th	12 1/2	—	—	—	Chicago White Sox	
1979	AA	69–67	.507	4th	2nd	9	—	—	—	Chicago White Sox	
1980	AA	59–77	.434	7th	3rd	16	—	—	—	Chicago White Sox	
1981	AA	53–82	.393	8th	4th	19 1/2	—	—	—	Chicago Cubs	
1982	AA	73–62	.541	2nd (tie)	2nd (tie)	1 1/2	—	—	—	Chicago Cubs	
1983^	AA	71–65	.522	3rd	2nd	7 1/2	1–3	.250	Lost semifinals vs. Denver Bears, 3–1	Chicago Cubs	
1984^	AA	80–74	.519	2nd	—	11	1–4	.200	Lost semifinals vs. Denver Zephyrs, 4–1	Chicago Cubs	
1985	AA	66–75	.468	6th	4th	12 1/2	—	—	—	Chicago Cubs	
1986	AA	74–68	.521	3rd	2nd	2	—	—	—	Chicago Cubs	
1987	AA	64–74	.464	6th	—	14	—	—	—	Chicago Cubs	
1988	AA	78–64	.549	3rd	2nd	3	—	—	—	Chicago Cubs	
1989	AA	62–82	.431	7th	3rd	11	—	—	—	Chicago Cubs	
1990	AA	72–74	.493	5th	2nd	14	—	—	—	Chicago Cubs	
1991	AA	78–66	.542	3rd	2nd	1	—	—	—	Chicago Cubs	
1992	AA	51–92	.357	8th	4th	22 1/2	—	—	—	Chicago Cubs	
1993 * †	AA	85–59	.590	1st	1st	—	4–3	.571	Won Western Division title Won AA championship vs. Nashville Sounds, 4–3	Chicago Cubs	
1994	AA	69–74	.483	5th	—	17	—	—	—	Chicago Cubs	
1995	AA	69–74	.483	5th	—	18 1/2	—	—	—	Chicago Cubs	
1996	AA	64–78	.451	6th	3rd	14	—	—	—	Chicago Cubs	
1997 *	AA	74–69	.517	3rd (tie)	1st	—	3–3	.500	Won Western Division title Won semifinals vs. New Orleans Zephyrs, 3–0; Lost AA championship vs. Buffalo Bisons, 3–0	Chicago Cubs	
1998 *	PCL	85–59	.590	1st	1st	—	1–2	.333	Won American Conference Central Division title Lost American Conference title vs. New Orleans Zephyrs, 2–1	Chicago Cubs	
1999	PCL	65–76	.461	14th	4th	16	—	—	—	Chicago Cubs	
2000	PCL	57–87	.396	16th	4th	29	—	—	—	Chicago Cubs	
2001 *	PCL	83–60	.580	3rd	1st	—	0–3	.000	Won American Conference Central Division title Lost American Conference title vs. New Orleans Zephyrs, 3–0	Chicago Cubs	
2002	PCL	71–73	.493	11th	3rd	7	—	—	—	Chicago Cubs	
2003	PCL	70–72	.493	8th (tie)	3rd	3	—	—	—	Chicago Cubs	
2004 * §	PCL	79–64	.552	4th	1st	—	3–5	.375	Won American Conference Central Division title Won American Conference title vs. Oklahoma RedHawks, 3–2; Lost PCL championship vs. Sacramento River Cats, 3–0	Chicago Cubs	
2005	PCL	64–75	.460	13th	4th	8 1/2	—	—	—	Chicago Cubs	
2006	PCL	76–68	.528	5th (tie)	1st (tie)	—	—	—	—	Chicago Cubs	
2007	PCL	79–65	.549	3rd	2nd	10	—	—	—	Chicago Cubs	
2008 *	PCL	83–59	.585	1st	1st	—	2–3	.400	Won American Conference Northern Division title Lost American Conference title vs. Oklahoma RedHawks, 3–2	Chicago Cubs	
2009	PCL	72–72	.500	9th	3rd	5	—	—	—	Chicago Cubs	
2010	PCL	82–62	.569	1st (tie)	1st (tie)	—	—	—	—	Chicago Cubs	
2011	PCL	66–77	.462	12th	4th	13 1/2	—	—	—	Chicago Cubs	
2012	PCL	53–87	.379	16th	4th	28	—	—	—	Chicago Cubs	
2013	PCL	66–78	.458	14th	3rd	4	—	—	—	Chicago Cubs	
2014	PCL	74–70	.514	7th (tie)	2nd (tie)	2 1/2	—	—	—	Chicago Cubs	
2015	PCL	80–64	.556	3rd (tie)	2nd (tie)	6	—	—	—	Chicago Cubs	
2016	PCL	67–76	.469	13th	3rd	15	—	—	—	Chicago Cubs	
2017	PCL	67–72	.482	10th (tie)	4th	14	—	—	—	Chicago Cubs	
2018	PCL	50–88	.362	16th	4th	24	—	—	—	Chicago Cubs	
2019 *	PCL	75–65	.536	5th	1st	—	2–3	.400	Won American Conference Northern Division title Lost American Conference title vs. Round Rock Express, 3–2	Chicago Cubs	
2020	PCL	Season cancelled (COVID-19 pandemic)								Chicago Cubs	
2021	AAAE	51–78 (Note: In 2021, the team with the best record at the end of the regular-season was declared the Triple-A East champion. Iowa had a 50–70 (.417) record, 27 games behind first place, which put them 16th in the league and 7th in their division. The regular-season was followed by the Triple-A Final Stretch, a 10-game postseason tournament in which all 30 Triple-A clubs competed for the highest winning percentage. Iowa finished the tournament in 29th place with a 1–8 (.111) record.)	.395	18th	7th	22 1/2	—	—	—	Chicago Cubs	
2022	IL	68–81	.456	16th	9th	23	—	—	—	Chicago Cubs	
2023	IL	82–65	.558	5th	3rd	1 1/2	—	—	—	Chicago Cubs	
2024	IL	68–82	.453	19th	9th	22	—	—	—	Chicago Cubs	
2025	IL	74–75	.497	11th	5th	13	—	—	—	Chicago Cubs	
2026	IL	63–82	.434	19th	10th	17 1/2	—	—	—	Chicago Cubs	
Totals	—	3,954–4,108	.490	—	—	—	20–33	.377	—	—	—

== Roster ==
Iowa Cubs roster
Players	Coaches/Other
Pitchers: 46 Tyler Ferguson *; 48 Kohl Franklin; 24 Braxton Garrett *; 33 Gavin Hollowell #; 27 Antoine Kelly *; 29 Grant Kipp ~; 36 Gabe Klobosits; 38 Corbin Martin; 17 Shelby Miller #; 39 Jayden Murray *; 40 Doug Nikhazy; 38 Connor Noland ~; 13 Eduarniel Núñez; 49 Luis Peralta; 50 Ethan Roberts *; 2 Tyler Santana; 53 Collin Snider †; 9 Justin Steele #; 51 Evan Taylor; 20 Andrew Wantz; 32 Jordan Wicks *; 22 Jaxon Wiggins; Catchers: 4 Owen Ayers; 1 Daniel Campos ~; 5 Ethan Hearn; 47 Austin Wynns; Infielders: 0 Hayden Cantrelle; 37 Jackson Cluff; 4 Ben Cowles; 6 Owen Miller; 41 BJ Murray Jr. *; 7 James Triantos *; Outfielders: 12 Justin Dean *; 21 Greg Jones; 11 Chas McCormick; 25 Jordan Nwogu; Designated hitters: 13 Kevin Alcántara *	Manager: 29 Marty Pevey; Coaches: 52 Tony Cougoule (pitching); 17 Taylor Fortney (hitting); 18 Nick Lovullo (bench); 44 Damon Minor (hitting); 50 Jamie Vermilyea (pitching); 60-day injured list: -- Brandon Birdsell; -- Zac Leigh; 37 Jack Neely; -- Will Sanders; 7-day injured list; * On Chicago Cubs 40-man roster; ~ Development list; # Rehab assignment; ∞ Reserve list; ‡ Restricted list; § Suspended list; † Temporarily inactive list; Roster updated September 19, 2026; Transactions; → More rosters: MiLB • International League; → Chicago Cubs minor league players

== Awards ==
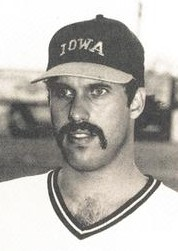
Dewey Robinson won the AA Most Valuable Pitcher Award in 1979.

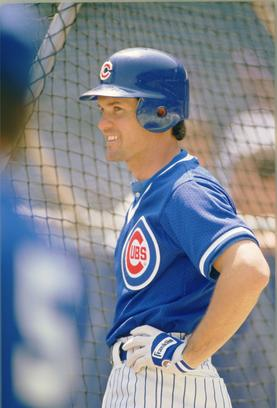
Ryne Sandberg won the PCL Manager of the Year Award in 2010.

The franchise has been awarded these honors by Minor League Baseball.

Minor League Baseball Awards
Award	Season	Ref.
John H. Johnson President's Award	1978	
John H. Johnson President's Award	2002	
Larry MacPhail Award	1986	

Nine players, five managers, and one executive have won league awards in recognition for their performance with Iowa.

American Association Awards
Award	Recipient	Season	Ref.
Most Valuable Player	Eduardo Zambrano	1993	
Most Valuable Pitcher	Dewey Robinson	1979	
Most Valuable Pitcher	Jay Howell	1982	
Rookie of the Year	Mel Hall	1982	
Rookie of the Year	Joe Carter	1983	
Manager of the Year	Joe Sparks	1973	
Manager of the Year	Jim Napier	1982	

Pacific Coast League Awards
Award	Recipient	Season	Ref.
Most Valuable Player	Geovany Soto	2007	
Most Valuable Player	Bryan LaHair	2011	
Pitcher of the Year	Carlos Pimentel	2015	
Pitcher of the Year	Colin Rea	2019	
Manager of the Year	Terry Kennedy	1998	
Manager of the Year	Pat Listach	2008	
Manager of the Year	Ryne Sandberg	2010	
Executive of the Year	Sam Bernabe	2008	
