= Louisville Bats =

- Founded in 1982; Louisville, Kentucky

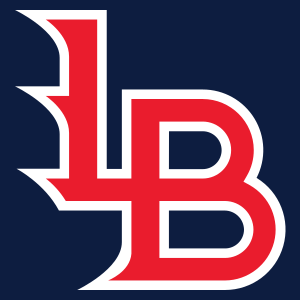
Team logo	Cap insignia

Minor league affiliations
- Class: Triple-A (1982–present)
- League: International League (1998–present)
- Division: West Division
- Previous leagues: American Association (1982–1997)

Major league affiliations
- Team: Cincinnati Reds (2000–present)
- Previous teams: Milwaukee Brewers (1998–1999); St. Louis Cardinals (1982–1997)

Minor league titles
- League titles (4): 1984; 1985; 1995; 2001
- Division titles (8): 1983; 1985; 1998; 2001; 2003; 2008; 2009; 2010

Team data
- Name: Louisville Bats (2002–present)
- Previous names: Louisville RiverBats (1999–2001); Louisville Redbirds (1982–1998)
- Colors: Red, navy, white
- Mascot: Buddy Bat
- Ballpark: Louisville Slugger Field (2000–present)
- Previous parks: Cardinal Stadium (1982–1999)
- Owner/ Operator: Diamond Baseball Holdings
- President: Greg Galiette
- Manager: Pat Kelly
- Website: milb.com/louisville

The Louisville Bats are a Minor League Baseball team of the International League (IL) and the Triple-A affiliate of the Cincinnati Reds. They are located in Louisville, Kentucky, and are named in dual reference to the winged mammal and baseball bats, such as those manufactured locally under the Louisville Slugger brand. The team plays their home games at Louisville Slugger Field, which opened in 2000. The Bats previously played at Cardinal Stadium from 1982 to 1999.

The club began play as the Louisville Redbirds in the Triple-A American Association (AA) in 1982. Louisville won three AA championships: in 1984, 1985, and 1995 as the top affiliate of the St. Louis Cardinals. They joined the Triple-A International League in 1998 following the dissolution of the AA after the 1997 season. The Redbirds rebranded as the Louisville RiverBats in 1999; this was shortened to Bats in 2002. In conjunction with Major League Baseball's restructuring of Minor League Baseball in 2021, the Bats were shifted to the Triple-A East, but this was renamed the International League in 2022. Their lone IL championship was won in 2001 with Cincinnati.

== History ==
=== American Association (1982–1997) ===
In 1982, the St. Louis Cardinals moved their Triple-A team of the American Association (AA), the Springfield Redbirds, from Springfield, Illinois, to Louisville, Kentucky, where they became the Louisville Redbirds. They played their home games at Cardinal Stadium, which was located at the Kentucky Exposition Center and seated over 30,000 people. The stadium previously hosted the Louisville Colonels from 1957 to 1972.

During their inaugural 1982 season, the Redbirds broke the minor league attendance record by drawing 868,418 people to Cardinal Stadium. On the field, the team narrowly missed the playoffs when they finished in second place, just one-and-a-half games out of first at 73–62. In 1983, the Redbirds became the first minor league team to draw over one million fans in a single season (1,052,438). The team improved to league-best 78–57 and won the Eastern Division title, which qualified them for the postseason. Though Louisville won the semifinals versus the Oklahoma City 89ers, 3–2, they lost the AA championship to the Denver Bears, 4–0, in the finals. Manager Jim Fregosi was selected as the AA Manager of the Year. The franchise was awarded the 1983 John H. Johnson President's Award, recognizing them as the "complete baseball franchise—based on franchise stability, contributions to league stability, contributions to baseball in the community, and promotion of the baseball industry."

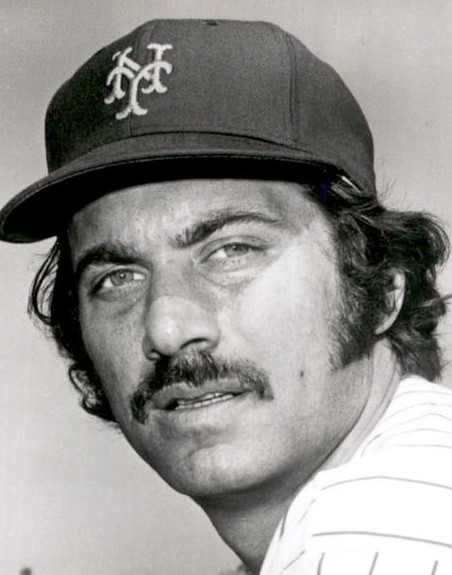
Jim Fregosi led Louisville to win back-to-back AA titles in 1984 and 1985.

Fregosi led the Redbirds to win back-to-back American Association championships in 1984 and 1985. The 1984 squad won the semifinals against the Indianapolis Indians, 4–2, before winning their first league title over the Denver Zephyrs, 4–1. Their second came the next season after winning the 1985 Eastern Division title and defeating Oklahoma City, 4–1, in the only round of playoffs. Fregosi won his second Manager of the Year Award for the 1985 campaign.

The 1987 team made a return to the postseason, but they were eliminated by Indianapolis, 3–2, in the semifinals. Outfielder Lance Johnson was honored with both the AA Most Valuable Player (MVP) Award and Rookie of the Year Award. Louisville regularly finished third or fourth in their four-team division over the next six seasons. A pair of Redbirds won league awards, however, during this period. René Arocha was selected as the 1992 Most Valuable Pitcher, and catcher Todd Zeile was the 1989 Rookie of the Year. The team qualified for a playoff spot in 1994, but they were quickly swept out of the semifinals, 3–0, by Indianapolis. The Redbirds came back in 1995 to sweep Indianapolis in the semis before winning a third AA championship versus the Buffalo Bisons, 3–2, behind manager Joe Pettini.

=== International League (1998–2020) ===
Louisville experienced a number of changes around the turn of the millennium. The American Association, of which the Redbirds had been members since 1982, disbanded after the 1997 season. Its teams were absorbed by the two remaining Triple-A leagues—the International League (IL) and Pacific Coast League (PCL), with Louisville joining the IL. Their 16-year relationship with the St. Louis Cardinals also ended after the 1997 season when the Cardinals chose to move their Triple-A affiliation to the Memphis Redbirds, a PCL expansion team. Louisville then became the top farm club of the Milwaukee Brewers in 1998. They started their time in the IL by winning the Western Division title, but in the Governors' Cup playoffs, they were eliminated in the semifinals by the Durham Bulls, 3–0. In 1999, the team rebranded as the Louisville RiverBats. The name was a dual reference to Louisville's location on the Ohio River and baseball bats, such as those manufactured locally under the Louisville Slugger brand. Their new logos incorporated a bat (the animal) swinging a baseball bat. After a second season with the Brewers, Louisville entered into a new affiliation with the Cincinnati Reds in 2000. They also left Cardinal Stadium for the new US$27.8 million Louisville Slugger Field. Located in downtown Louisville, the new ballpark seats 13,131 people with a more intimate setting than their previous facility.

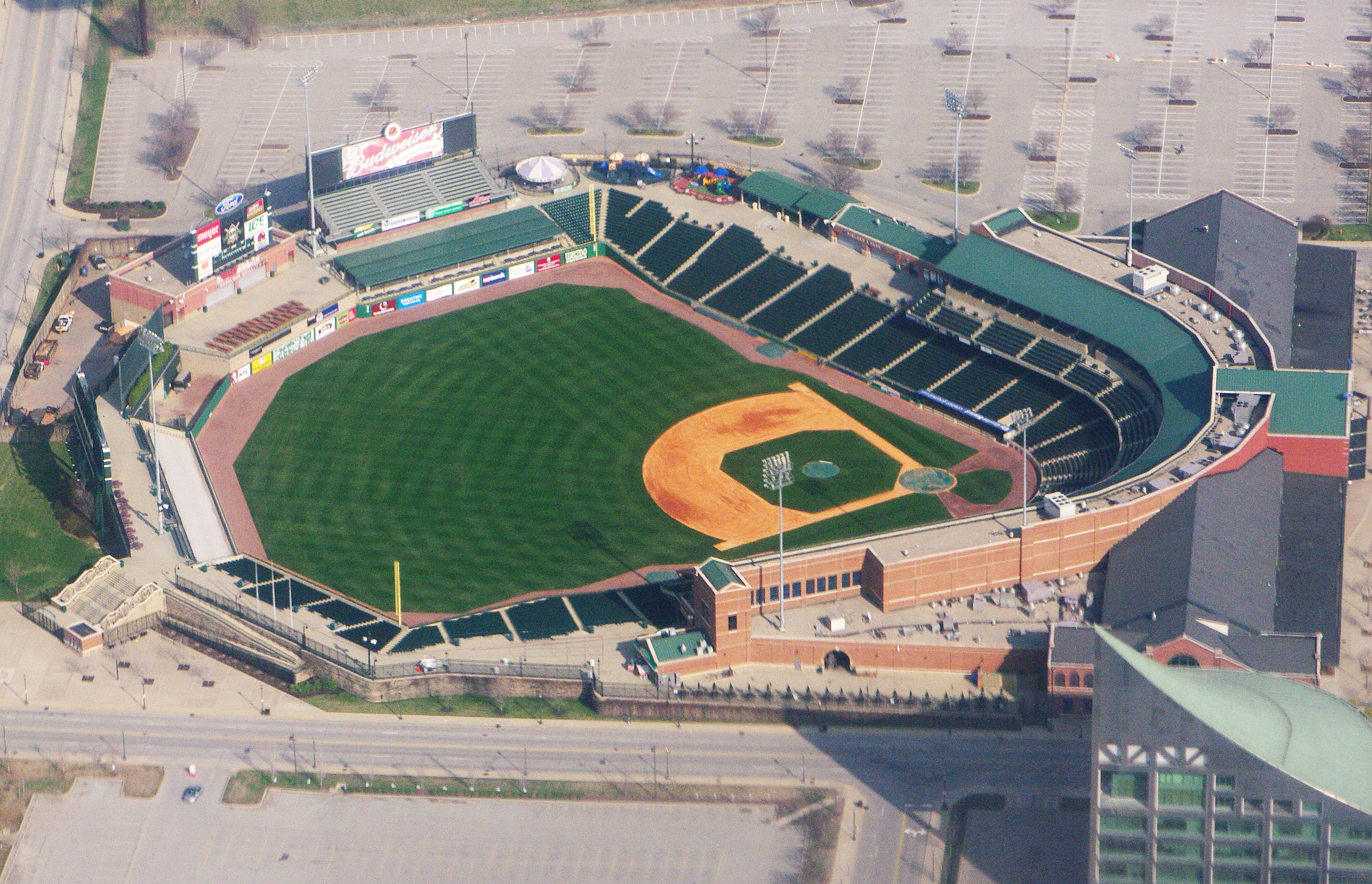
Louisville Slugger Field, home of the Louisville Bats since 2000

In 2001, manager Dave Miley led the RiverBats to an 84–60 record and the Western Division title. They defeated the Norfolk Tides, 3–2, in the semifinals to advance to the final round against the Scranton/Wilkes-Barre Red Barons. Louisville won the first game of the series, 2–1, before the September 11 terrorist attacks resulted in the cancellation of the rest of the playoffs. The RiverBats were declared the International League champions for 2001.

Louisville dropped "River" from its name to become simply the Louisville Bats in 2002. Outfielder Raúl González won that season's IL MVP Award. The team returned to the playoffs in 2003, with another division title, but they were ousted in the semifinals by Durham, 3–1. In 2007, first baseman Joey Votto was selected for the IL Rookie of the Year Award. The Bats made three consecutive trips to the postseason from 2008 to 2010 with back-to-back-to-back division titles, but they were eliminated by Durham each time in the semifinals. Rick Sweet won the IL Manager of the Year Award in 2008 and 2009, and Justin Lehr won the Most Valuable Pitcher Award in 2009. Typically finishing third or fourth out of four teams in the Western Division, Louisville did not again qualify for the Governors' Cup playoffs after 2010.

Right fielder Aristides Aquino was selected as the 2019 IL Rookie of the Year. The start of the 2020 season was postponed due to the COVID-19 pandemic before being cancelled on June 30.

=== Triple-A East / International League (2021–present) ===
Following the 2020 season, Major League Baseball assumed control of Minor League Baseball in a move to increase player salaries, modernize facility standards, and reduce travel. The Cincinnati Reds retained Louisville as their Triple-A affiliate, but the International League disbanded, and the Bats followed the other IL teams into the Triple-A East. Louisville ended the season in sixth place in the Midwestern Division with a 51–68 record. No playoffs were held to determine a league champion; instead, the team with the best regular-season record was declared the winner. However, 10 games that had been postponed from the start of the season were reinserted into the schedule as a postseason tournament called the Triple-A Final Stretch in which all 30 Triple-A clubs competed for the highest winning percentage. Louisville finished the tournament tied for 18th place with a 4–5 record. In 2022, the Triple-A East became known as the International League, the name historically used by the regional circuit prior to the 2021 reorganization. In December 2023, the team was purchased by Diamond Baseball Holdings.

== Season-by-season records ==
Season-by-season records (last five seasons)
Season	League	Regular-season					Postseason			MLB affiliate	Ref.
Season	League	Record	Win %	League	Division	GB	Record	Win %	Result	MLB affiliate	Ref.
2022	IL	60–90	.400	19th	10th	31 1/2	—	—	Result	—	Cincinnati Reds
2023	IL	75–73	.507	9th	4th	9	—	—	—	Cincinnati Reds	
2024	IL	67–82	.450	20th	10th	22 1/2	—	—	—	Cincinnati Reds	
2025	IL	71–79	.473	12th	6th	16 1/2	—	—	—	Cincinnati Reds	
2026	IL	65–83	.439	18th	9th	17	—	—	—	Cincinnati Reds	
Totals	—	338–407	.454	—	—	—	—	—	—	—	—

== Logos and colors ==
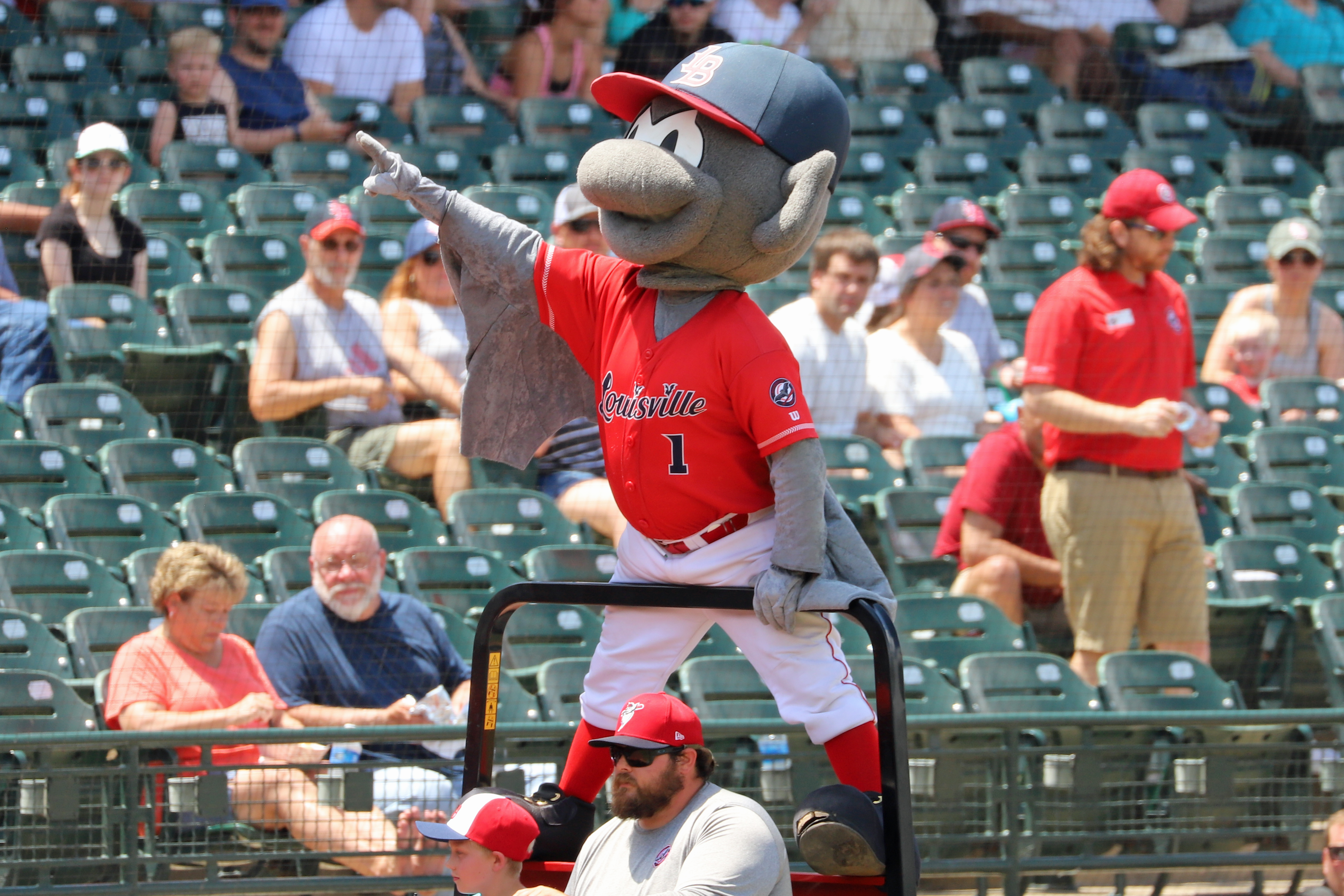
Buddy Bat, the team mascot

The Louisville Redbirds based their original visual identity on that of their major league parent, the St. Louis Cardinals, from 1982 to 1998. The team's uniforms were of red and white, while their logo featured a cardinal preparing to swing a baseball bat. When they rebranded as the RiverBats in 1999, their color scheme became purple and green, while the logo depicted a bat swinging a baseball bat. When this moniker was shortened to "Bats" in 2002, the palette was switched to purple, black, and gold, and the logo to an abstract bat shape. The Bats' current color scheme of red, navy blue, and white was adopted in 2016. Additionally, the rebranding updated the logo to depict a flying bat in front of a moon, which resembled a baseball, while gripping a baseball bat in its talons.

== Radio and television ==
Since 2019, Jim Kelch has been the play-by-play announcer for Bats radio broadcasts. He previously served in the role from 1989 to 2009 before leaving to work for the Cincinnati Reds broadcast team from 2010 to 2017. Other Louisville broadcasters that went on to broadcast for MLB teams include Joe Buck (1989–1990), Todd Kalas (1991), and Mark Neely (1992–1994).

As of 2019, all Bats home and road games were broadcast on WKRD 790 AM. Live audio broadcasts are also available online through the team's website and the MiLB First Pitch app. Games can be viewed through the MiLB.TV subscription feature of the official website of Minor League Baseball, with audio provided by a radio simulcast.

== Roster ==
Louisville Bats roster
Players	Coaches/Other
Pitchers: 37 Kevin Abel; 21 Jose Acuna ~; 23 Graham Ashcraft * #; 18 Sam Benschoter; 51 Cameron Cotter; 40 Kent Emanuel * ~; 48 Jose Franco *; 54 Hunter Greene * #; 31 Brandon Leibrandt *; 32 Jared Lyons; 57 Zach Maxwell *; 62 Zach McCambley *; 36 Anthony Misiewicz *; 7 Kyle Nicolas *; 51 Emilio Pagan * #; 49 Hunter Parks; 14 Chase Petty *; 34 Connor Phillips *; 60 Tony Santillan * #; 62 Chase Solesky *; 53 Carson Spiers; 0 Darius Vines *; 45 Ben Wereski; 38 Brandon Williamson * #; Catchers: 10 P.J. Higgins *; 20 Dayne Leonard ~; 26 Michael Trautwein; Infielders: 43 Orlando Arcia *; 19 Edwin Arroyo *; 3 Leo Balcazar *; 4 Michael Chavis; 44 Elly De La Cruz * #; 5 Garrett Hampson; 15 Ivan Johnson *; 17 Dominic Pitelli; 13 Francisco Urbaez; Outfielders: 22 Jay Allen II; 30 Will Benson *; 18 Dominic Fletcher *; 23 Rece Hinds *; 4 Noelvi Marte *	Manager: 33 Pat Kelly; Coaches: 46 Reid Cornelius (pitching); 25 Vince Harrison (coach); 28 Carson Phillips (pitching); 6 Peterson Plaz (coach); 55 Daryle Ward (hitting); 60-day injured list: 41 Trevor Kuncl (full season); 7-day injured list; * On Cincinnati Reds 40-man roster; ~ Development list; # Rehab assignment; ∞ Reserve list; ‡ Restricted list; § Suspended list; † Temporarily inactive list; Roster updated September 18, 2026; Transactions; → More rosters: MiLB • International League; → Cincinnati Reds minor league players

== Achievements ==
=== Awards ===
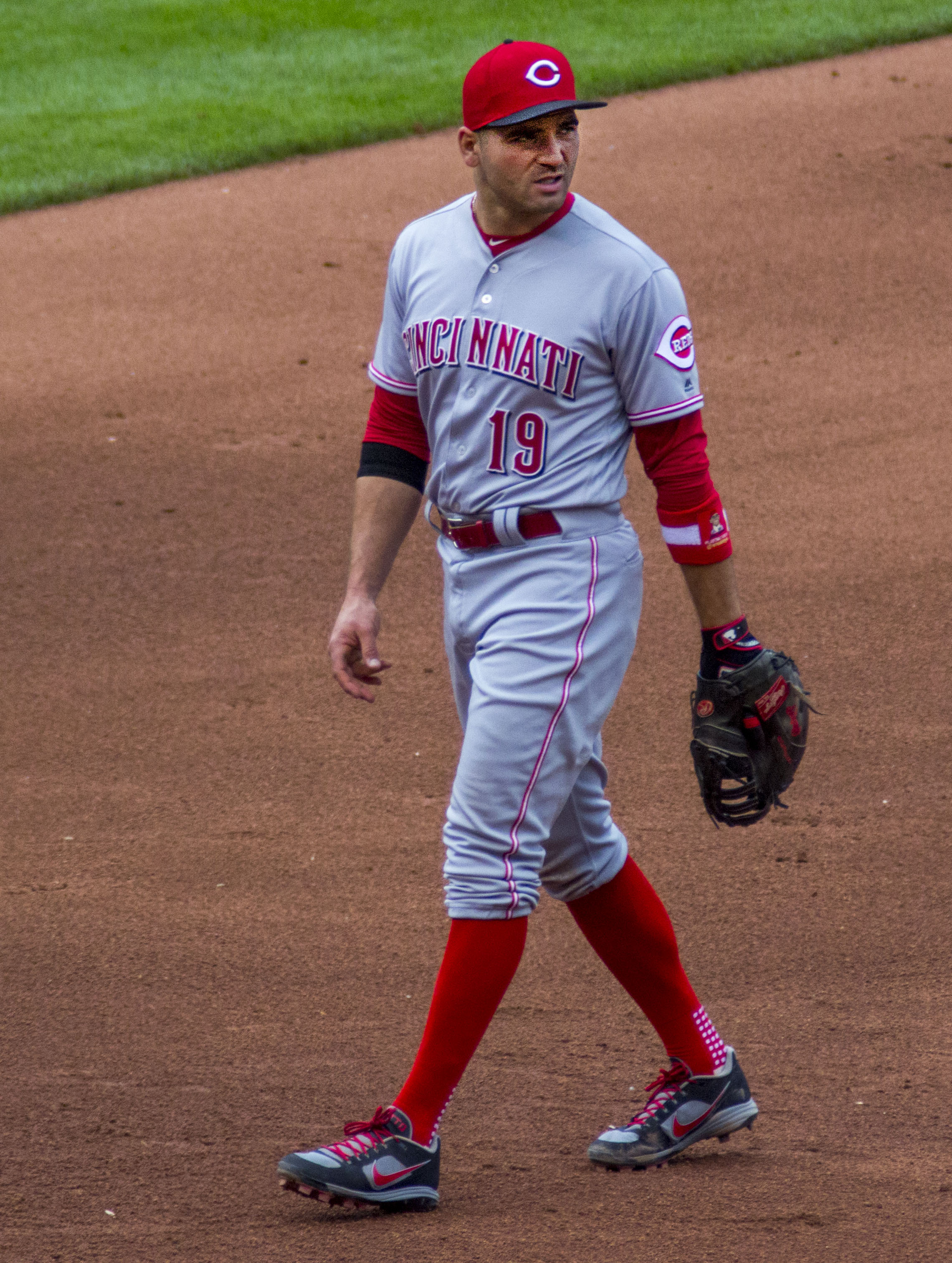
Joey Votto won the IL Rookie of the Year Award in 2007.

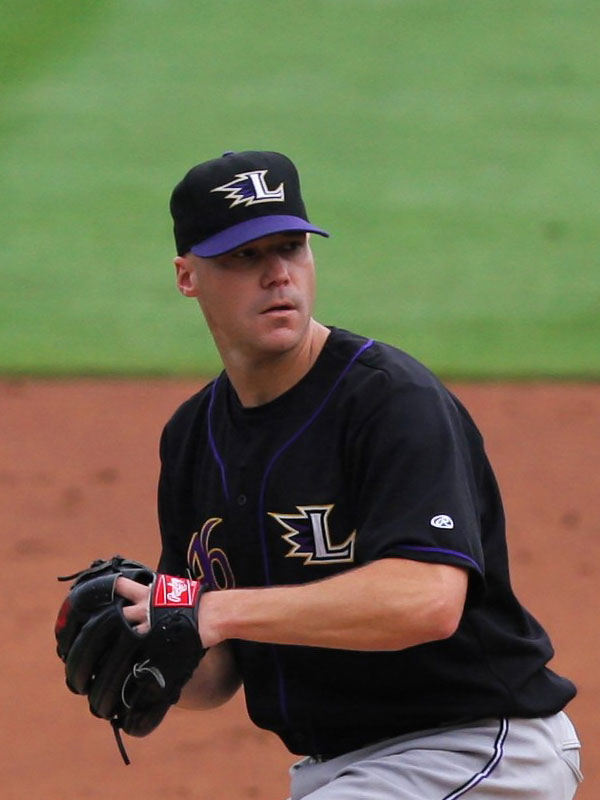
Justin Lehr won the IL Most Valuable Pitcher Award in 2009.

The franchise has been awarded these honors by Minor League Baseball.

Minor League Baseball Awards
Award	Season	Ref.
John H. Johnson President's Award	1983	

Seven players, two managers, and two executives have won league awards in recognition for their performance with Louisville.

American Association Awards
Award	Recipient	Season	Ref.
Most Valuable Player	Lance Johnson	1987	
Most Valuable Pitcher	René Arocha	1992	
Rookie of the Year	Lance Johnson	1987	
Rookie of the Year	Todd Zeile	1989	
Manager of the Year	Jim Fregosi	1983	
Manager of the Year	Jim Fregosi	1985	

International League Awards
Award	Recipient	Season	Ref.
Most Valuable Player	Raúl González	2002	
Most Valuable Pitcher	Justin Lehr	2009	
Rookie of the Year	Joey Votto	2007	
Rookie of the Year	Aristides Aquino	2019	
Manager of the Year	Rick Sweet	2008	
Manager of the Year	Rick Sweet	2009	
Executive of the Year	Gary Ulmer	2007	
Spirit of the IL	Lois Estridge	2014	

=== Retired numbers ===
The Louisville Bats have honored three players who played in Louisville (for the Bats or another franchise) by retiring their uniform numbers, as well as number 42. The retired uniform numbers are displayed inside Louisville Slugger Field. The Bats also honor Minor League Baseball's The Nine platform with the number 9.

- 1 – Harold "Pee Wee" Reese

The Bats retired the number 1 for Louisville native and Baseball Hall of Famer Harold "Pee Wee" Reese in a ceremony on July 28, 2018.

- 2 – Felton Snow

The number 2 was retired for Louisville resident and Negro leagues All-Star Felton Snow in a ceremony on September 2, 2022.

- 8 – Corky Miller

Corky Miller's number 8 was retired on August 31, 2014. A catcher from 2001 to 2004 and 2009 to 2014, Miller held the franchise record for games played (548) and doubles (99) at the time of its retirement.

- 42 – Jackie Robinson

Pee Wee Reese's Brooklyn Dodgers teammate Jackie Robinson, whose number 42 was retired throughout professional baseball on April 15, 1997, was honored by the Bats along with Reese in a ceremony on July 28, 2018.

== Managers ==
Louisville has had 17 managers since their inaugural 1982 season.

Manager	Season(s)
Joe Frazier	1982
Jim Fregosi	1983–1986
Dave Bialas	1986
Mike Jorgensen	1987–1989
Gaylen Pitts	1990
Mark DeJohn	1991
Jack Krol	1992–1993
Joe Pettini	1994–1996
Gaylen Pitts	1997
Gary Allenson	1998–1999
Dave Miley	2000–2003
Rick Burleson	2003–2004
Rick Sweet	2005–2011
David Bell	2012–2013
Jim Riggleman	2014
Delino DeShields	2015–2017
Pat Kelly	2018
Jody Davis	2019
Pat Kelly	2020–present

== See also ==
- Sports in Louisville, Kentucky
