= Minor League Baseball Organization of the Year Award =

- Sport: Baseball
- League: Minor League Baseball
- Awarded for: Best franchise in Minor League Baseball
- Country: United States; Canada; Mexico
- Presented by: Minor League Baseball

History
- First award: Rochester Red Wings (1974)
- Most recent: West Michigan Whitecaps (2025)

The Minor League Baseball Organization of the Year Award, formerly known as the John H. Johnson President's Award or simply the President's Award, is presented annually by Minor League Baseball (MiLB) to recognize "a 'complete' baseball franchise that has demonstrated franchise stability and significant contributions to its community, league, and the baseball industry." It is considered MiLB's top honor and is usually awarded during baseball's Winter Meetings. The award, first issued in 1974, was created by MiLB president Hank Peters as the President's Award. It was renamed in 1988 in honor of John H. Johnson, who served as the president of Minor League Baseball from 1979 until his death in January 1988. It became known as the MiLB Organization of the Year Award in 2021 after Major League Baseball assumed control of the minor leagues.

Forty-five teams have won the award. The Albuquerque Dukes, Billings Mustangs, Durham Bulls, Iowa Cubs, Rochester Red Wings, and Tacoma Rainiers have each won the award twice, more than any other teams. International League franchises have won the award nine times, more than any other league, followed by the Pacific Coast League (8); the Midwest League (6); the American Association (5); the Eastern League (5); the Texas League (4); the Northwest League and Pioneer League (3); the California League and Carolina League (2); and the Appalachian League, Mexican League, South Atlantic League, and Southern League (1). Twenty-three winners have competed at the Triple-A classification level, more than any other class, followed by Double-A (10); Single-A/Class A (8); High-A/Class A-Advanced and Rookie (4); and Class A Short Season (2).

== Winners ==
Key
(#)	Number of wins by teams who won the award multiple times

Winners
Year	Team	League	Class	Ref.
1974	Rochester Red Wings (1)	International League	Triple-A	
1975	Tacoma Twins (1)	Pacific Coast League	Triple-A	
1976	Diablos Rojos del México	Mexican League	Triple-A	
1977	Fresno Giants	California League	Class A	
1978	Iowa Oaks (1)	American Association	Triple-A	
1979	Denver Bears	American Association	Triple-A	
1980	Quad City Cubs	Midwest League	Class A	
1981	Great Falls Giants	Pioneer League	Rookie	
1982	Tacoma Tigers (2)	Pacific Coast League	Triple-A	
1983	Louisville Redbirds	American Association	Triple-A	
1984	Albuquerque Dukes (1)	Pacific Coast League	Triple-A	
1985	Las Vegas Stars	Pacific Coast League	Triple-A	
1986	El Paso Diablos	Texas League	Double-A	
1987	Syracuse Chiefs	International League	Triple-A	
1988	Indianapolis Indians	American Association	Triple-A	
1989	Durham Bulls (1)	Carolina League	Class A	
1990	Pawtucket Red Sox	International League	Triple-A	
1991	Albuquerque Dukes (2)	Pacific Coast League	Triple-A	
1992	Buffalo Bisons	American Association	Triple-A	
1993	Norfolk Tides	International League	Triple-A	
1994	Billings Mustangs (1)	Pioneer League	Rookie	
1995	Columbus Clippers	International League	Triple-A	
1996	Salt Lake Buzz	Pacific Coast League	Triple-A	
1997	Richmond Braves	International League	Triple-A	
1998	Lynchburg Hillcats	Carolina League	Class A-Advanced	
1999	Tulsa Drillers	Texas League	Double-A	
2000	Portland Sea Dogs	Eastern League	Double-A	
2001	Eugene Emeralds	Northwest League	Class A Short Season	
2002	Iowa Cubs (2)	Pacific Coast League	Triple-A	
2003	Reading Phillies	Eastern League	Double-A	
2004	Rochester Red Wings (2)	International League	Triple-A	
2005	Trenton Thunder	Eastern League	Double-A	
2006	Altoona Curve	Eastern League	Double-A	
2007	Midland RockHounds	Texas League	Double-A	
2008	Cedar Rapids Kernels	Midwest League	Class A	
2009	San Jose Giants	California League	Class A-Advanced	
2010	Billings Mustangs (2)	Pioneer League	Rookie	
2011	Tennessee Smokies	Southern League	Double-A	
2012	Dayton Dragons	Midwest League	Class A	
2013	Vancouver Canadians	Northwest League	Class A Short Season	
2014	Durham Bulls (2)	International League	Triple-A	
2015	South Bend Cubs	Midwest League	Class A	
2016	Fort Wayne TinCaps	Midwest League	Class A	
2017	Greenville Drive	South Atlantic League	Class A	
2018	Albuquerque Isotopes	Pacific Coast League	Triple-A	
2019	Pulaski Yankees	Appalachian League	Rookie	
2020	None selected (season cancelled due to COVID-19 pandemic)			
2021	Spokane Indians	High-A West	High-A	
2022	Nashville Sounds	International League	Triple-A	
2023	Amarillo Sod Poodles	Texas League	Double-A	
2024	Hartford Yard Goats	Eastern League	Double-A	
2025	West Michigan Whitecaps	Midwest League	High-A	
