= Karl Pagel =

American baseball player (born 1955)

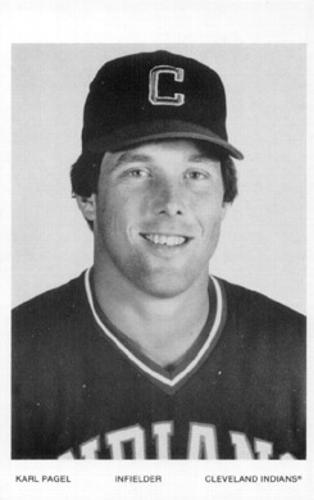
- First baseman / Outfielder
- Born: March 29, 1955 (age 71); Madison, Wisconsin, U.S.
- Batted: Left Threw: Left

MLB debut
- September 21, 1978, for the Chicago Cubs

Last appearance
- September 30, 1983, for the Cleveland Indians

MLB statistics
- Batting average: .232
- Home runs: 1
- Runs batted in: 7
- Stats at Baseball Reference

Teams
- Chicago Cubs (1978–1979); Cleveland Indians (1981–1983)

Career highlights and awards
- 1977 Texas League Most Valuable Player; 1979 American Association MVP; 1979 Minor League Player of the Year

Karl Douglas Pagel (born March 29, 1955) is an American former Major League Baseball first baseman who played for five seasons. He played for the Chicago Cubs from 1978 to 1979 and the Cleveland Indians from 1981 to 1983.

In nine minor league seasons, Pagel hit .294 with 163 home runs and 587 RBIs. Pagel was named MVP of the Texas League in 1977 when he played for the Midland Cubs. Pagel was named MVP of the American Association in 1979 while playing for the Wichita Aeros. Pagel was named to the International League All-Star team in 1982 with the Charleston Charlies. Pagel retired following the 1984 season in which he played for in the Maine Guides.

Pagel lives in the Phoenix, Arizona area, where he has worked as a driver for UPS. Karl is the brother of former NFL quarterback Mike Pagel.
