= List of American Association (1902–1997) champions =

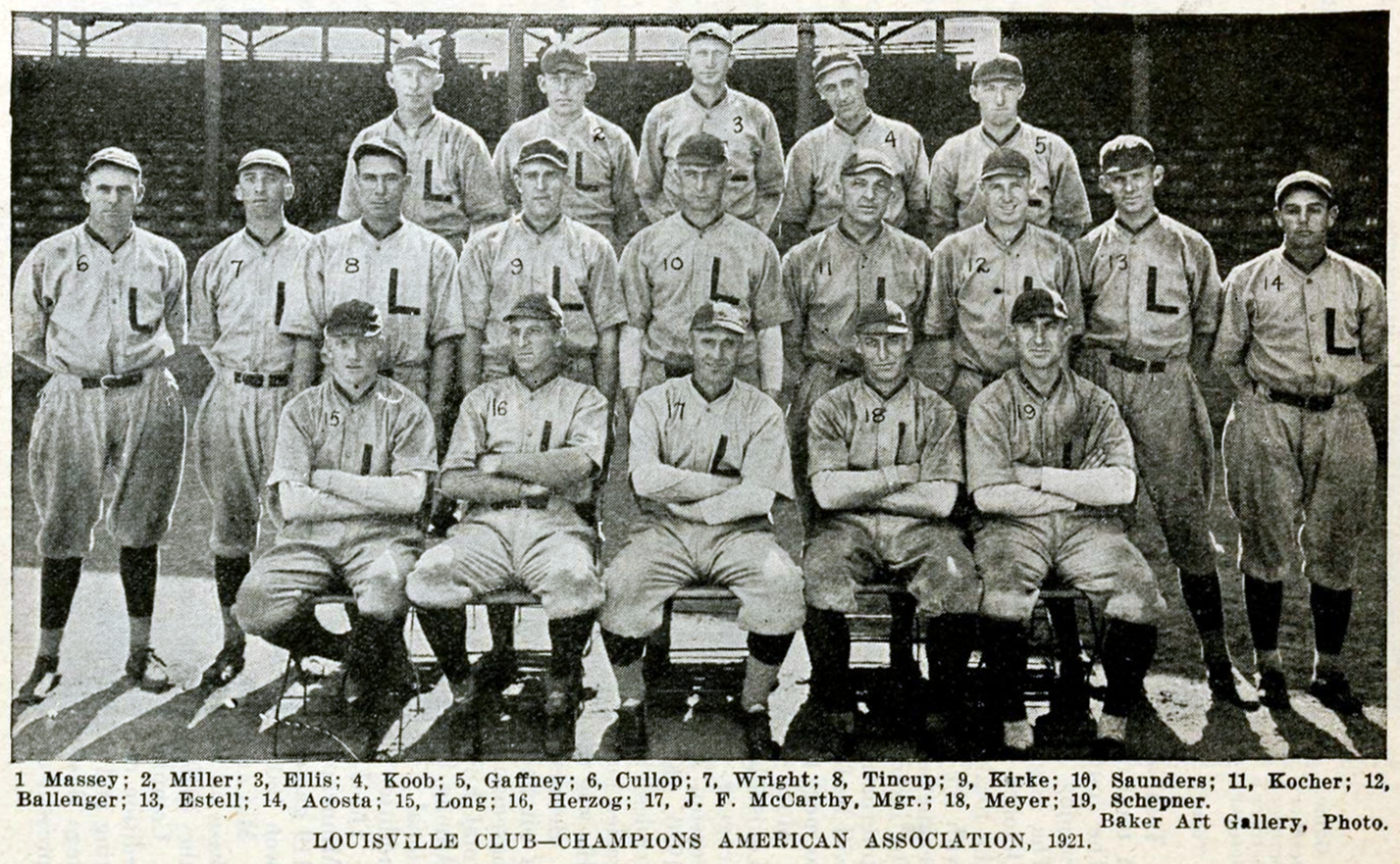
The Louisville Colonels (shown in 1921) won 15 championships, more than any other team.

The American Association was a Minor League Baseball league that operated in the United States from 1902 to 1962 and from 1969 to 1997. A champion was determined at the end of each season.

From 1902 to 1932 and in 1935, champions were the regular-season pennant winners—the team with the best win–loss record at the conclusion of the regular season. In 1933 and 1934, the top two teams competed in a postseason series to determine a champion. The Shaughnessy playoff system, in which the top four teams qualified for postseason play, was adopted from 1936 to 1962. The American Association dissolved after the 1962 season, but it was reorganized in 1969. After crowning that year's pennant winner as champion, it divided its teams into two divisions, and the division champions played for the league title from 1970 to 1980. A variety of postseason playoff formats were used over the next 17 seasons before the league disbanded for a final time following the 1997 campaign.

The Louisville Colonels won 15 American Association championships, more than any other team, followed by the Indianapolis Indians (12); the Columbus Red Birds (10); the Minneapolis Millers (9); the St. Paul Saints (8); the Denver Zephyrs (7); the Kansas City Blues (6); the Milwaukee Brewers (5); the Omaha Royals (4); the Evansville Triplets and Louisville Redbirds (3); the Oklahoma City 89ers and Tulsa Oilers (2); and the Buffalo Bisons, Iowa Cubs, Springfield Redbirds, and Toledo Mud Hens (1).

== History ==
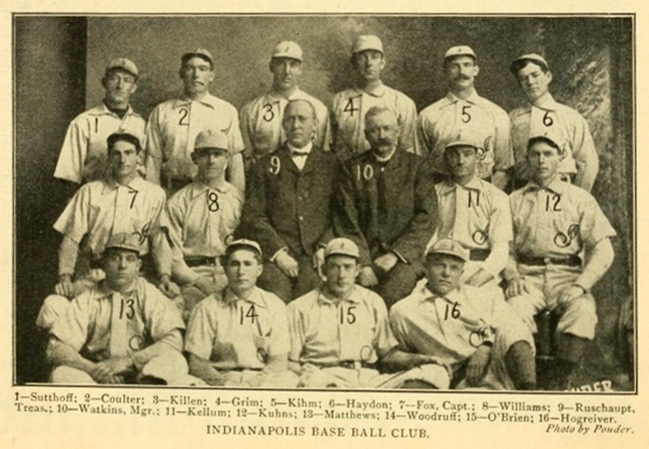
The Indianapolis Indians won the first American Association championship in 1902.

The American Association, which was founded in 1902, determined a league champion at the end of each season. Champions from 1902 to 1932 were simply the regular-season pennant winners—the team with the best win–loss record at the conclusion of the regular championship season. The first league champions were the Indianapolis Indians, who won by two games over the Louisville Colonels in 1902.

The first championship playoffs were held in 1933. The top two teams, based on winning percentage, competed for the championship in a best-of-seven series. The first playoff championship was won by the Columbus Red Birds, who defeated the Minneapolis Millers, 4–2, in 1933. Similar playoffs were held in 1934, but the league returned to recognizing the regular-season pennant winner as champion in 1935.

The American Association adopted the Shaughnessy playoff system in 1936. Under this expanded playoff format, the four teams with the highest winning percentage competed for the championship. From 1936 to 1962, the first round typically consisted of a series between the first and third-place teams and a series between the second and fourth-place teams, though other seedings were occasionally used. The winners of these semifinals then faced one another for the championship. With few exceptions, each series during this period was the best-of-seven games. The first four-team playoff was won in 1936 by the Milwaukee Brewers, who defeated Indianapolis, 4–1.

The circuit disbanded after the 1962 season, but was reorganized for 1969. The first champions in this second iteration of the league were the regular-season pennant winners. The Omaha Royals won by virtue of a six-game lead over the Tulsa Oilers. The American Association divided its teams into two divisions, East and West, in 1970. From 1970 to 1980, the winners of each division met in a best-of-seven series (sometimes five) to determine a champion.

Across the league's last 17 seasons, 1981 to 1997, three different postseason formats were utilized. Some seasons ended with the East and West Division champions facing off in a single round. Some saw wild card berths awarded to the second-place team from each division. After a series between the division champions and a series between the wild card teams, the winners would play for the league championship. Still in others, the league played without divisions, and the top four teams qualified for the playoffs. In these scenarios, the first round consisted of a series between the first and fourth-place teams and between the second and third-place teams, with the winners competing for the league title. Most rounds during this period were best-of-five series, though some final rounds and fewer semifinals were sometimes the best-of-seven. The circuit permanently disbanded after the 1997 season. The final American Association championship was won by the Buffalo Bisons, who defeated the Iowa Cubs, 3–0.

== Champions ==
=== Pre-playoff champions (1902–1932) ===
Key
Record	Regular-season win–loss record
GA	Games ahead of the second-place team

Champions
Year	Champion	Record	GA	Runner-up	Ref.
1902	Indianapolis Indians	96–45	2	Louisville Colonels	
1903	St. Paul Apostles	88–46	4 1/2	Louisville Colonels	
1904	St. Paul Apostles	95–52	8	Columbus Senators	
1905	Columbus Senators	100–52	8	Milwaukee Brewers	
1906	Columbus Senators	91–57	8	Milwaukee Brewers	
1907	Columbus Senators	90–64	1 1/2	Toledo Mud Hens	
1908	Indianapolis Indians	92–61	4	Louisville Colonels	
1909	Louisville Colonels	93–75	2 1/2	Milwaukee Brewers	
1910	Minneapolis Millers	107–61	15	Toledo Mud Hens	
1911	Minneapolis Millers	99–66	4 1/2	Kansas City Blues	
1912	Minneapolis Millers	105–60	6 1/2	Toledo Mud Hens	
1913	Milwaukee Brewers	100–67	3	Minneapolis Millers	
1914	Milwaukee Brewers	98–68	4	Louisville Colonels	
1915	Minneapolis Millers	92–62	1 1/2	St. Paul Saints	
1916	Louisville Colonels	101–66	5 1/2	Indianapolis Indians	
1917	Indianapolis Indians	90–63	2 1/2	Louisville Colonels (Note: Louisville and St. Paul were tied for second place.); St. Paul Saints	
1918	Kansas City Blues (Note: The 1918 season was suspended after the games of July 21 as team owners voted to end the season in response to the "work or fight" order issued by Secretary of War Newton D. Baker to aid the effort to win World War I. Kansas City, in first place at the time, was awarded the pennant.)	43–30	2	Columbus Senators	
1919	St. Paul Saints	94–60	6 1/2	Kansas City Blues	
1920	St. Paul Saints	115–49	28 1/2	Louisville Colonels	
1921	Louisville Colonels	98–70	4 1/2	Minneapolis Millers	
1922	St. Paul Saints	107–60	15	Minneapolis Millers	
1923	Kansas City Blues	112–54	2	St. Paul Saints	
1924	St. Paul Saints	96–70	4	Indianapolis Indians	
1925	Louisville Colonels	106–61	13 1/2	Indianapolis Indians	
1926	Louisville Colonels	105–62	10	Indianapolis Indians	
1927	Toledo Mud Hens	101–67	2	Kansas City Blues (Note: Kansas City and Milwaukee were tied for second place.); Milwaukee Brewers	
1928	Indianapolis Indians	99–68	2 1/2	Minneapolis Millers	
1929	Kansas City Blues	111–56	8 1/2	St. Paul Saints	
1930	Louisville Colonels	93–60	2 1/2	St. Paul Saints	
1931	St. Paul Saints	104–63	14	Kansas City Blues	
1932	Minneapolis Millers	100–68	10 1/2	Columbus Red Birds	

=== Playoff era champions (1933–1962, 1969–1997) ===
Key
Score	Score of the championship series
P	Regular-season pennant winner
E	East Division winner
W	West Division winner

Champions
Year	Champion	Score	Runner-up	Other playoff teams	Ref.
1933	Columbus Red Birds^{P}	4–2	Minneapolis Millers	—	
1934	Columbus Red Birds	4–3	Minneapolis Millers^{P}	—	
1935	Minneapolis Millers	— (Note: Minneapolis (91–63) finished 5 games ahead of Indianapolis.)	Indianapolis Indians	—	
1936	Milwaukee Brewers^{P}	4–1	Indianapolis Indians	Kansas City Blues & St. Paul Saints	
1937	Columbus Red Birds^{P}	4–2	Milwaukee Brewers	Minneapolis Millers & Toledo Mud Hens	
1938	Kansas City Blues	4–3	St. Paul Saints^{P}	Indianapolis Indians & Milwaukee Brewers	
1939	Louisville Colonels	4–1	Indianapolis Indians	Kansas City Blues^{P} & Minneapolis Millers	
1940	Louisville Colonels	4–2	Kansas City Blues^{P}	Columbus Red Birds & Minneapolis Millers	
1941	Columbus Red Birds^{P}	4–1	Louisville Colonels	Minneapolis Millers & Kansas City Blues	
1942	Columbus Red Birds	4–0	Toledo Mud Hens	Kansas City Blues^{P} & Milwaukee Brewers	
1943	Columbus Red Birds	3–0	Indianapolis Indians	Milwaukee Brewers^{P} & Toledo Mud Hens	
1944	Louisville Colonels	4–0	St. Paul Saints	Milwaukee Brewers^{P} & Toledo Mud Hens	
1945	Louisville Colonels	4–2	St. Paul Saints	Indianapolis Indians & Milwaukee Brewers^{P}	
1946	Louisville Colonels^{P}	4–0	Indianapolis Indians	Minneapolis Millers & St. Paul Saints	
1947	Milwaukee Brewers	4–3	Louisville Colonels	Kansas City Blues^{P} & Minneapolis Millers	
1948	St. Paul Saints	4–3	Columbus Red Birds	Indianapolis Indians^{P} & Milwaukee Brewers	
1949	Indianapolis Indians	4–3	Milwaukee Brewers	Minneapolis Millers & St. Paul Saints^{P}	
1950	Columbus Red Birds	4–3	Indianapolis Indians	Minneapolis Millers^{P} & St. Paul Saints	
1951	Milwaukee Brewers^{P}	4–2	St. Paul Saints	Kansas City Blues & Louisville Colonels	
1952	Kansas City Blues	4–3	Milwaukee Brewers^{P}	Minneapolis Millers & St. Paul Saints	
1953	Kansas City Blues	4–3	Toledo Sox^{P}	Indianapolis Indians & Louisville Colonels	
1954	Louisville Colonels	4–1	Indianapolis Indians^{P}	Columbus Red Birds & Minneapolis Millers	
1955	Minneapolis Millers^{P}	4–0	Omaha Cardinals	Denver Bears & Louisville Colonels	
1956	Indianapolis Indians^{P}	4–0	Denver Bears	Minneapolis Millers & Omaha Cardinals	
1957	Denver Bears	4–2	St. Paul Saints	Minneapolis Millers & Wichita Braves^{P}	
1958	Minneapolis Millers	4–0	Denver Bears	Charleston Senators^{P} & Wichita Braves	
1959	Minneapolis Millers	4–3	Fort Worth Cats	Louisville Colonels^{E} & Omaha Cardinals^{W}	
1960	Louisville Colonels	4–2	Denver Bears^{P}	Houston Buffs & St. Paul Saints	
1961	Louisville Colonels	4–2	Houston Buffs	Denver Bears & Indianapolis Indians^{P}	
1962	Louisville Colonels	4–2	Denver Bears	Indianapolis Indians^{P} & Omaha Dodgers	
1969	Omaha Royals	— (Note: Omaha (85–55) finished 6 games ahead of Tulsa.)	Tulsa Oilers	—	
1970	Omaha Royals^{E}	4–1	Denver Bears^{W}	—	
1971	Denver Bears^{W}	4–3	Indianapolis Indians^{E}	—	
1972	Evansville Triplets^{E}	3–0	Wichita Aeros^{W}	—	
1973	Tulsa Oilers^{W}	4–3	Iowa Oaks^{E}	—	
1974	Tulsa Oilers^{W}	4–3	Indianapolis Indians^{E}	—	
1975	Evansville Triplets^{E}	4–2	Denver Bears^{W}	—	
1976	Denver Bears^{W}	4–2	Omaha Royals^{E}	—	
1977	Denver Bears^{W}	4–2	Omaha Royals^{E}	—	
1978	Omaha Royals^{W}	4–1	Indianapolis Indians^{E}	—	
1979	Evansville Triplets^{E}	4–2	Oklahoma City 89ers^{W}	—	
1980	Springfield Redbirds^{E}	4–1	Denver Bears^{W}	—	
1981	Denver Bears	4–0	Omaha Royals^{W}	Evansville Triplets^{E} & Springfield Redbirds	
1982	Indianapolis Indians^{E}	4–2	Omaha Royals^{W}	—	
1983	Denver Bears^{W}	4–0	Louisville Redbirds^{E}	Iowa Cubs & Oklahoma City 89ers	
1984	Louisville Redbirds	4–1	Denver Zephyrs	Indianapolis Indians^{P} & Iowa Cubs	
1985	Louisville Redbirds^{E}	4–1	Oklahoma City 89ers^{W}	—	
1986	Indianapolis Indians^{E}	4–3	Denver Zephyrs^{W}	—	
1987	Indianapolis Indians	4–1	Denver Zephyrs^{P}	Louisville Redbirds & Oklahoma City 89ers	
1988	Indianapolis Indians^{E}	3–1	Omaha Royals^{W}	—	
1989	Indianapolis Indians^{E}	3–2	Omaha Royals^{W}	—	
1990	Omaha Royals^{W}	3–2	Nashville Sounds^{E}	—	
1991	Denver Zephyrs^{W}	3–2	Buffalo Bisons^{E}	—	
1992	Oklahoma City 89ers^{W}	4–0	Buffalo Bisons^{E}	—	
1993	Iowa Cubs^{W}	4–3	Nashville Sounds^{E}	—	
1994	Indianapolis Indians^{P}	3–1	Nashville Sounds	Louisville Redbirds & New Orleans Zephyrs	
1995	Louisville Redbirds	3–2	Buffalo Bisons	Indianapolis Indians^{P} & Omaha Royals	
1996	Oklahoma City 89ers	3–1	Indianapolis Indians	Buffalo Bisons^{E} & Omaha Royals^{W}	
1997	Buffalo Bisons^{E}	3–0	Iowa Cubs^{W}	Indianapolis Indians & New Orleans Zephyrs	

== Wins by team ==
Team	Wins	Year(s)
Louisville Colonels	15	1909, 1916, 1921, 1925, 1926, 1930, 1939, 1940, 1944, 1945, 1946, 1954, 1960, 1961, 1962
Indianapolis Indians	12	1902, 1908, 1917, 1928, 1949, 1956, 1982, 1986, 1987, 1988, 1989, 1994
Columbus Red Birds (Columbus Senators)	10	1905, 1906, 1907, 1933, 1934, 1937, 1941, 1942, 1943, 1950
Minneapolis Millers	9	1910, 1911, 1912, 1915, 1932, 1935, 1955, 1958, 1959
St. Paul Saints (St. Paul Apostles)	8	1903, 1904, 1919, 1920, 1922, 1924, 1931, 1948
Denver Zephyrs (Denver Bears)	7	1957, 1971, 1976, 1977, 1981, 1983, 1991
Kansas City Blues	6	1918, 1923, 1929, 1938, 1952, 1953
Milwaukee Brewers	5	1913, 1914, 1936, 1947, 1951
Omaha Royals	4	1969, 1970, 1978, 1990
Evansville Triplets	3	1972, 1975, 1979
Louisville Redbirds	3	1984, 1985, 1995
Oklahoma City 89ers	2	1992, 1996
Tulsa Oilers	2	1973, 1974
Buffalo Bisons	1	1997
Iowa Cubs	1	1993
Springfield Redbirds	1	1980
Toledo Mud Hens	1	1927

== See also ==
- List of International League champions
- List of Pacific Coast League champions
