= Gil Torres (baseball) =

Cuban baseball player (1915-1983)

- Infielder
- Born: August 23, 1915; Regla, Cuba
- Died: January 10, 1983 (aged 67); Regla, Cuba
- Batted: Right Threw: Right

MLB debut
- April 25, 1940, for the Washington Senators

Last MLB appearance
- September 14, 1946, for the Washington Senators

MLB statistics
- Batting average: .252
- Home runs: 0
- Runs batted in: 119
- Stats at Baseball Reference

Teams
- Washington Senators (1940, 1944–46)

Don Gilberto Torres Núñez (August 23, 1915 – January 10, 1983) was a Cuban professional baseball player who appeared in 346 games in the Major Leagues for the 1940 and 1944–1946 Washington Senators. The native of Regla, Cuba, was a shortstop and third baseman who stood 6 feet (1.8 m) tall and weighed 155 pounds (70 kg). He threw and batted right-handed.

Torres' professional career extended for 21 seasons (1935–1955), and he played almost 1,350 games in minor league baseball. He was the Senators' starting third baseman in 1944 and their starting shortstop in 1945, the final two seasons of the World War II manpower shortage in baseball. His 320 MLB hits included 40 doubles and 11 triples.

He was the son of Ricardo Torres, a catcher and first baseman in professional baseball who played in 22 games for the Senators between 1920 and 1922. Torres was first signed to a US professional contract with the Milwaukee Brewers of the American Association upon the recommendation of fellow Cuban player Joe Olivares.

== See also ==
- List of second-generation Major League Baseball players

== Sources ==
- Career statistics from Baseball Reference · Retrosheet · Baseball Almanac
