= Joe Olivares =

Cuban baseball player

- Shortstop
- Born: August 1, 1906; La Habana, Cuba
- Bats: Right Throws: Right

Jose "Joe" Olivares (August 1, 1906 – unknown) was a Cuban professional baseball shortstop. Nine of his 14 professional seasons, from 1927 to 1935, were spent with the Louisville Colonels of the American Association. According to the Milwaukee Journal reporter Sam Levy, Olivares was the first Cuban star in the American Association. In 1930 he won the American Association Most Valuable Player Award as the Colonels were surprise contenders for the American Association Championship. He had a batting average of .296 and a slugging percentage of .414 that season. He partnered with future Hall of Famer Billy Herman at second base to form the Colonels' double play combination that season, and 1920 World Series hero Bill Wambsganss was also a second baseman on that team.

Olivares was noted for his defense at shortstop. Levy considered him the "game's greatest exponent of the hidden ball trick." With the Chattanooga Lookouts in 1936, Olivares successfully used the hidden ball trick seven times. In 1936 former Major Leaguer Jimmy Adair, who played second base for the Colonels with Olivares from 1932 to 1935, claimed that Olivares would be one of the top four defensive shortstops in the Majors, stating that while Leo Durocher was probably the best, Olivares "does not have to take a back seat to him." Adair also expressed surprise that Olivares had not been picked up by a Major League team. In 1934, Olivares and Adair had a collision behind second base as a result of which both had to be hospitalized.

According to Levy, Cuban pitcher Gil Torres, who would pitch in the Major Leagues for the Washington Senators, was signed to his first pro contract in the US with the Milwaukee Brewers on the recommendation of Olivares.

Olivares came to the United States from Cuba in 1925 with only a quarter to his name to try to play professional baseball in the US. The Colonels originally assigned him to the Chattanooga Lookouts but was assigned to the Johnstown Johnnies a few days later because Olivares spoke no English and the Lookouts' manager spoke no Spanish. He played second base for the Johnnies because the shortstop was future Hall of Famer Joe Cronin. Olivares finally played for the Lookouts in 1936 and 1937 after he was sold to them for $1000 before the 1936 season.
