= Jack Smith (pitcher) =

American baseball player (1935–2021)

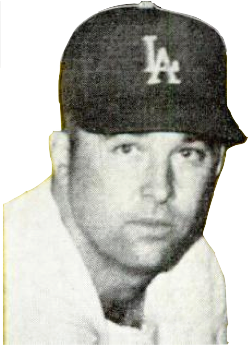
- Smith in 1963.
- Pitcher
- Born: November 15, 1935; Pikeville, Kentucky, U.S.
- Died: April 7, 2021 (aged 85); Conyers, Georgia, U.S.
- Batted: Right Threw: Right

MLB debut
- September 10, 1962, for the Los Angeles Dodgers

Last MLB appearance
- June 21, 1964, for the Milwaukee Braves

MLB statistics
- Win–loss record: 2–2
- Earned run average: 4.56
- Strikeouts: 31
- Innings pitched: 491/3
- Stats at Baseball Reference

Teams
- Los Angeles Dodgers (1962–1963); Milwaukee Braves (1964)

Jack Hatfield Smith (November 15, 1935 – April 7, 2021) was an American professional baseball player. The native of Pikeville, Kentucky, was a right-handed pitcher who worked in 34 Major League Baseball (MLB) games (all in relief) for the Los Angeles Dodgers and Milwaukee Braves between 1962 and 1964. He was listed as 6 feet (1.83 m) tall and 185 pounds (84 kg).

Smith signed with the Dodgers in 1955 and rose slowly through their farm system until 1961, when he led the Double-A Southern Association in earned run average (2.09). The following season, he won 17 of 24 decisions in the Triple-A American Association and was named the league's Most Valuable Player. When MLB rosters expanded on September 1, 1962, Smith was added to the Dodgers' pitching staff for the stretch run as they fought furiously for the National League pennant with the San Francisco Giants. With the two teams deadlocked at the end of the regular season, they played a best-of-three tie-breaker series to decide the championship. Smith worked in the first two games and allowed one unearned run and two hits in two full innings pitched, as the Dodgers split those games. San Francisco won the series, however, in Game 3.

Smith started 1963 as a member of the Dodgers' early-season 28-man roster, but a poor performance on May 3 against the Pittsburgh Pirates resulted in his demotion to Triple-A for the rest of the year. The Braves then acquired him in the 1963 Rule 5 draft, and gave Smith his most extended MLB trial, using him in 22 games out of the bullpen during the 1964 season's first three months. He earned his first big-league victory against the Pirates on April 28 with four innings of one-run relief, and later in the year, on June 12, held the Giants hitless over three innings to gain his second win.

But, following a June 21 relief appearance against the Houston Colt .45s, Smith was sent down to Triple-A Denver, and never returned to the majors. He retired after the 1965 campaign.

In 34 MLB games and 491/3 innings pitched, he allowed 48 hits and 17 bases on balls. He split four decisions with a career ERA of 4.56, struck out 31 and was credited with one save.

Following his retirement from baseball, Smith became a barber in the Atlanta, Georgia area, first in downtown Atlanta and later near Hartsfield-Jackson International Airport before retiring in 2016.
