= Eduardo Zambrano =

Venezuelan baseball player (born 1966)

Eddie Zambrano
- Outfielder
- Born: February 1, 1966 (age 60); Maracaibo, Venezuela
- Batted: Right Threw: Right

MLB debut
- September 19, 1993, for the Chicago Cubs

Last MLB appearance
- August 10, 1994, for the Chicago Cubs

MLB statistics
- Batting average: .263
- Home runs: 6
- Runs batted in: 20
- Stats at Baseball Reference

Teams
- Chicago Cubs (1993–1994)

Eduardo José Zambrano (born February 1, 1966) is a Venezuelan former professional baseball player. He played parts of two Major League Baseball (MLB) seasons for the Chicago Cubs (1993–94), playing four different positions. He batted and threw right-handed.

== Career ==
He was the American Association MVP in 1993, leading the league with 32 home runs and 115 runs batted in. In the majors, Zambrano was a career .263 hitter (35-133), with six home runs, 20 RBI, 18 runs, seven doubles, and two stolen bases in 75 games.

Zambrano's nephew, Rougned Odor, plays in MLB.

== See also ==
- List of Major League Baseball players from Venezuela
