= Ivan Johnson =

Ivan Johnson may refer to:

- Ivan Johnson (baseball) (born 1998), American baseball player
- Ivan Johnson (basketball) (born 1984), American basketball player
- Ivan Johnson (cricketer) (1953–2021), English cricketer

== See also ==
- Ching Johnson (Ivan Johnson, 1897–1979), Canadian hockey player
