= Lance Johnson =

American baseball player (born 1963)

- Center fielder
- Born: July 6, 1963 (age 62); Cincinnati, Ohio, U.S.
- Batted: Left Threw: Left

MLB debut
- July 10, 1987, for the St. Louis Cardinals

Last MLB appearance
- May 27, 2000, for the New York Yankees

MLB statistics
- Batting average: .291
- Home runs: 34
- Runs batted in: 486
- Stolen bases: 327
- Stats at Baseball Reference

Teams
- St. Louis Cardinals (1987); Chicago White Sox (1988–1995); New York Mets (1996–1997); Chicago Cubs (1997–1999); New York Yankees (2000)

Career highlights and awards
- All-Star (1996)

Kenneth Lance Johnson (born July 6, 1963) is an American former professional baseball center fielder.

== Career ==
Johnson was born in Cincinnati, Ohio. After graduating from Princeton High School, he completed his education at the University of South Alabama. The St. Louis Cardinals drafted him in 6th round of the 1984 amateur draft. In 1986, he led the Class AA Arkansas Travelers with 82 runs, 129 hits, 6 triples, and a league-leading 49 stolen bases. At the age of 24, Johnson broke into the big leagues on July 10, 1987. Johnson, playing for the Louisville Redbirds, was the 1987 American Association Most Valuable Player. From 1988 to 1995 Johnson played for the Chicago White Sox.

Johnson is the only player in the history of Major League Baseball to lead both the American League and the National League in hits, and he did it in back-to-back seasons. He led the American League in hits in 1995 for the White Sox, and he led the National League in hits in 1996 for the Mets.

From 1991 through 1994, Johnson led the American League in triples, becoming the first player in Major League history to lead his league in triples for four consecutive years. In 1996, he led the National League in triples, becoming the third player in history to lead both leagues in triples (Sam Crawford and Brett Butler being the first two). Johnson is also one of three major leaguers (the other two are Joe Carter and Steve Sax) to lead both leagues in at bats two consecutive years (with the Chicago White Sox in 1995 and with the New York Mets in 1996), making him the only major leaguer to lead both leagues in at bats, hits and triples. As of 2013, he is one of only four players (Crawford, Stan Musial, and Willie Wilson) to lead the league in triples as many as five times. He is also one of a handful of players to collect three triples in one game, doing so on September 23, 1995, in the White Sox' 14–4 victory over the Minnesota Twins at the Hubert H. Humphrey Metrodome. The three triples were part of a 6-for-6 performance for Johnson, who became the first White Sox to collect six hits in one game since Floyd Robinson in 1962.

His finest season came in 1996 with the New York Mets. That year, he accumulated 227 hits, 21 triples (the highest single season total in that category since 1985), 50 steals, 31 doubles (the only season in which he accumulated at least 20), 69 Runs Batted In, 117 runs scored, and a .333 batting average, all career highs. This was Johnson's only season in which he was selected for the All Star team.

After the Mets, he played with the Chicago Cubs from 1997 to 1999. He was slowed down by injuries during his years with the Cubs and in 2000. The Yankees won the World Series that year and Johnson was given a World Series ring for his service to the team.

In 1447 games over 14 seasons, Johnson posted a .291 batting average (1565-for-5379) with 767 runs, 175 doubles, 117 triples, 34 home runs, 486 RBI, 327 stolen bases, 352 bases on balls, .334 on-base percentage and .386 slugging percentage. He finished his career with a .983 fielding percentage playing at all three outfield positions. In 11 postseason games, Johnson hit .200 (7-for-35) with 3 runs, 1 home run, 7 RBI and 3 stolen bases.

His speed on the base paths, and his uniform number "1", earned him the endearing nickname "One Dog".

He now resides in Alabama with his wife and his three children.

== See also ==
- List of Major League Baseball career stolen bases leaders
- List of Major League Baseball annual triples leaders
- List of Major League Baseball career triples leaders
- List of Major League Baseball triples records
- List of Major League Baseball single-game hits leaders
