= Jerry Witte =

American baseball player (1915-2002)

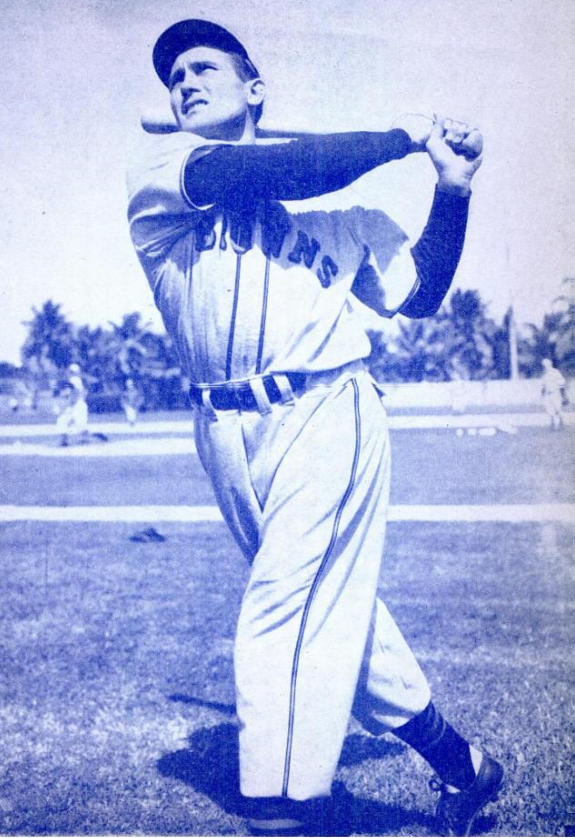
- First baseman
- Born: July 30, 1915; St. Louis, Missouri, U.S.
- Died: April 27, 2002 (aged 86); Houston, Texas, U.S.
- Batted: Right Threw: Right

MLB debut
- September 10, 1946, for the St. Louis Browns

Last MLB appearance
- July 13, 1947, for the St. Louis Browns

MLB statistics
- Batting average: .163
- Home runs: 4
- Runs batted in: 16
- Stats at Baseball Reference

Teams
- St. Louis Browns (1946–47)

Jerome Charles Witte (July 30, 1915 – April 27, 2002) was an American professional baseball player. He played parts of two seasons in Major League Baseball, 1946 and 1947, for the St. Louis Browns, primarily as a first baseman. He also had a long minor league baseball career, spanning 16 seasons from 1937 until 1952. In 1946, he won the American Association Most Valuable Player Award while playing for the Toledo Mud Hens, earning a shot at the major leagues that September.
