= Eric Owens (baseball) =

American baseball player (born 1971)

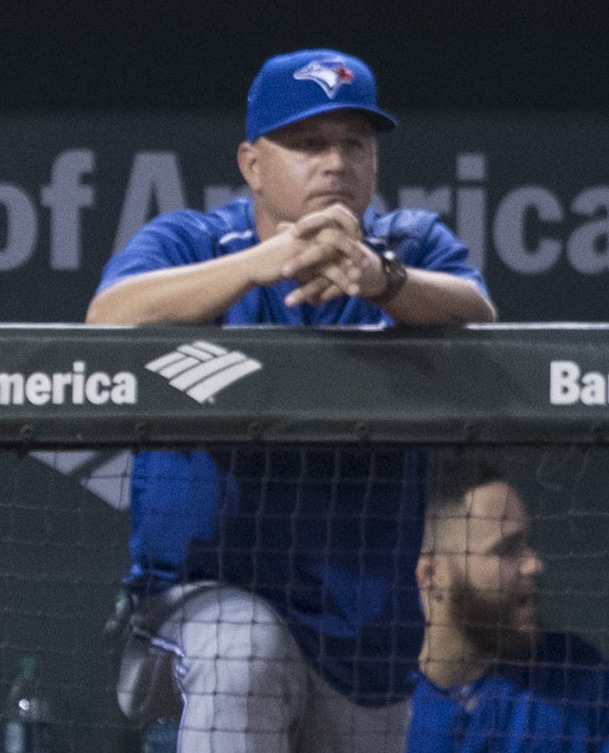
- Owens with the Toronto Blue Jays in 2016
- Outfielder
- Born: February 3, 1971 (age 55); Danville, Virginia, U.S.
- Batted: Right Threw: Right

MLB debut
- June 6, 1995, for the Cincinnati Reds

Last MLB appearance
- September 27, 2003, for the Anaheim Angels

MLB statistics
- Batting average: .264
- Home runs: 26
- Runs batted in: 214
- Stats at Baseball Reference

Teams
- Cincinnati Reds (1995–1997); Milwaukee Brewers (1998); San Diego Padres (1999–2000); Florida Marlins (2001–2002); Anaheim Angels (2003)

Eric Blake Owens (born February 3, 1971) is an American former professional baseball outfielder. He played for five Major League Baseball (MLB) teams from 1995 through 2003.

== Career ==
Owens was selected by the Cincinnati Reds in the fourth round of the 1992 MLB draft out of Ferrum College, where he played baseball and football. As a ballplayer, he led his team into the NCAA Regionals three times and was named to the All-America first team in 1991 and 1992, including a pair of South Regional runner-up finishes in both seasons, while earning Dixie Conference Player of the Year honors in 1992.

Owens left Ferrum the owner of seven school records, including marks for career batting average (.430), stolen bases (68) and triples (18), while batting over .400 in each of his three college seasons.

Owens made his MLB debut with the Reds in 1995, playing with them for three seasons before joining the Milwaukee Brewers (1998), San Diego Padres (1999–2000), Florida Marlins (2001–2002) and Anaheim Angels (2003).

On July 15, 1999, Owens became the first player to collect a hit at Safeco Field, lining the sixth pitch of the game from Seattle Mariners starter Jamie Moyer into shallow right field during an interleague game.

The Padres traded Owens to the Marlins prior to the 2001 season in a five-player deal that included Matt Clement and a minor leaguer in exchange for César Crespo and Mark Kotsay.

Additionally, Owens played in the Minor Leagues in all or parts of 10 seasons spanning 1992–2005, including stints with the Toledo Mud Hens of the Detroit Tigers organization in 2004 and the Mexican League in 2005. In between, he played winter ball with the Águilas del Zulia and Leones del Caracas clubs of the Venezuelan Professional Baseball League during the 1996–1999 seasons.

Owens gained induction into the Ferrum College Alumni Sports Hall of Fame as part of its Induction Class of 2002.

Following his playing career, Owens was hired by the Angels as the hitting coach for their Single-A Midwest League affiliate Cedar Rapids Kernels in 2006. He returned to Cedar Rapids in 2007 and served in the same capacity with the Double-A Arkansas Travelers in 2008. After that, he managed the Rancho Cucamonga Quakes and later worked as a roving instructor in the Angels minor league system.

On January 2, 2015, the Toronto Blue Jays announced that he would be their assistant hitting coach for the 2015 season. On October 24, 2016, general manager Ross Atkins stated at his end-of-season press conference that Owens would not be retained for the 2017 season.

On June 28, 2024, Owens was named Head Baseball Coach at Ferrum College.
