= Frank Ortenzio =

American baseball player (born 1951)

- First baseman
- Born: February 24, 1951 (age 75); Fresno, California, U.S.
- Batted: Right Threw: Right

Professional debut
- MLB: September 9, 1973, for the Kansas City Royals
- NPB: April 7, 1979, for the Nankai Hawks

Last appearance
- MLB: September 30, 1973, for the Kansas City Royals
- NPB: July 6, 1980, for the Nankai Hawks

MLB statistics
- Batting average: .280
- Home runs: 1
- Runs batted in: 6

NPB statistics
- Batting average: .250
- Home runs: 30
- Runs batted in: 70
- Stats at Baseball Reference

Teams
- Kansas City Royals (1973); Nankai Hawks (1979–1980)

Frank Joseph Ortenzio Jr. (born February 24, 1951) is an American former Major League Baseball first baseman. He played nine games for the Kansas City Royals in 1973. He also played two seasons (1979 and 1980) in Japan for the Nankai Hawks.

During his time with the Nankai Hawks, he was given the registered name, "Ohtenjoh (王天上)", which translates into the king above heaven. You would see this on scoreboards and in the newspaper. Normally foreign players in Japan are given names in katakana, but because his last name appeared close to Japanese sounds, the team decided to give him a kanji pictograph name.

== Sources ==
- Career statistics from Baseball Reference · Fangraphs · Baseball Reference (Minors) · Retrosheet · Baseball Almanac
