= Jim Olander =

American baseball player (born 1963)

- Outfielder
- Born: February 21, 1963 (age 62); Tucson, Arizona, U.S.
- Batted: Right Threw: Right

MLB debut
- September 20, 1991, for the Milwaukee Brewers

Last MLB appearance
- October 5, 1991, for the Milwaukee Brewers

MLB statistics
- Batting average: .000
- Home runs: 0
- Runs batted in: 0
- Stats at Baseball Reference

Teams
- Milwaukee Brewers (1991)

James Bentley Olander (born February 21, 1963) is an American former Major League Baseball outfielder and currently a baseball scout.

Olander attended Sahuaro High School in Tucson, Arizona. He was selected by Philadelphia Phillies in the 7th Round (175th overall) of the 1981 Major League Baseball draft. Olander played in the minor leagues from 1981 to 1994 with the Phillies, Milwaukee Brewers, and Houston Astros organizations. He was successful in the minor leagues: in 1986 he was named to the Eastern League's All-star Team and was viewed by the Phillies organization as a prospect likely to play in the majors. However his following seasons were shortened by injury and he eventually left the Phillies organization and signed as a free agent with the Astros who soon after traded him to the Brewers. Olander was named the Most Valuable Player of the American Association in 1991. That same year he was a "September call-up" and joined the Brewers for 12 games. Olander was expected to fight for a spot on the Brewers 1992 40-man roster but he broke his leg in early May. He never played another major-league game.

In October 2007, the Detroit Tigers promoted Olander from national crosschecker to big league scout, a job he still holds. He was responsible for recommending Cody Ross to the Tigers prior to the 1999 Major League Baseball draft.
