= Denver Zephyrs =

- 1955–1992; Denver, Colorado
Team logo
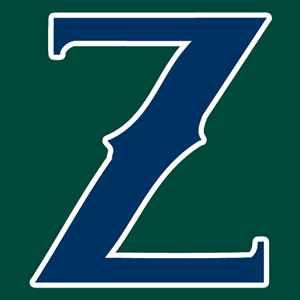
Cap insignia

Minor league affiliations
- Class: Triple-A (1955–1992)
- League: American Association (1969–1992); Pacific Coast League (1963–1968); American Association (1955–1962)

Major league affiliations
- Team: Milwaukee Brewers (1987–1992); Cincinnati Reds (1985–1986); Chicago White Sox (1983–1984); Texas Rangers (1982); Montreal Expos (1976–1981); Chicago White Sox (1975); Houston Astros (1973–1974); Texas Rangers (1972); Washington Senators (1970–1971); Minnesota Twins (1965–1969); Milwaukee Braves (1963–1964); Detroit Tigers (1960–1962); Unaffiliated (1959); New York Yankees (1955–1958)

Minor league titles
- Class titles (2): 1957; 1991
- League titles (7): 1957; 1971; 1976; 1977; 1981; 1983; 1991

Team data
- Name: Denver Zephyrs (1984–1992); Denver Bears (1955–1983)
- Ballpark: Mile High Stadium (1955–1992)

The Denver Zephyrs (formerly the Denver Bears) were a Minor League Baseball team based in Denver, Colorado, United States. They were a Triple-A team that played in the American Association from 1955 to 1962, the Pacific Coast League from 1963 to 1968, and the American Association again from 1969 to 1992. They played their home games at Mile High Stadium.

The Zephyrs won the American Association championship on seven occasions: 1957, 1971, 1976, 1977, 1981, 1983, and 1991. They also won the 1957 Junior World Series and the 1991 Triple-A Classic.

== History ==
=== Origins ===
Denver, Colorado, had been the home of numerous minor league baseball teams dating back to 1885 with an unnamed team of the Colorado State League. Off and on from 1901 to 1954, the city was represented by the Denver Bears of the Western League. In 1955, the Class A Bears were replaced by a Triple-A team of the American Association. This came about when the Kansas City Blues were forced to move after the American League's Philadelphia Athletics moved to Kansas City, Missouri, to become the Kansas City Athletics.

=== Denver Bears (1955–1983) ===
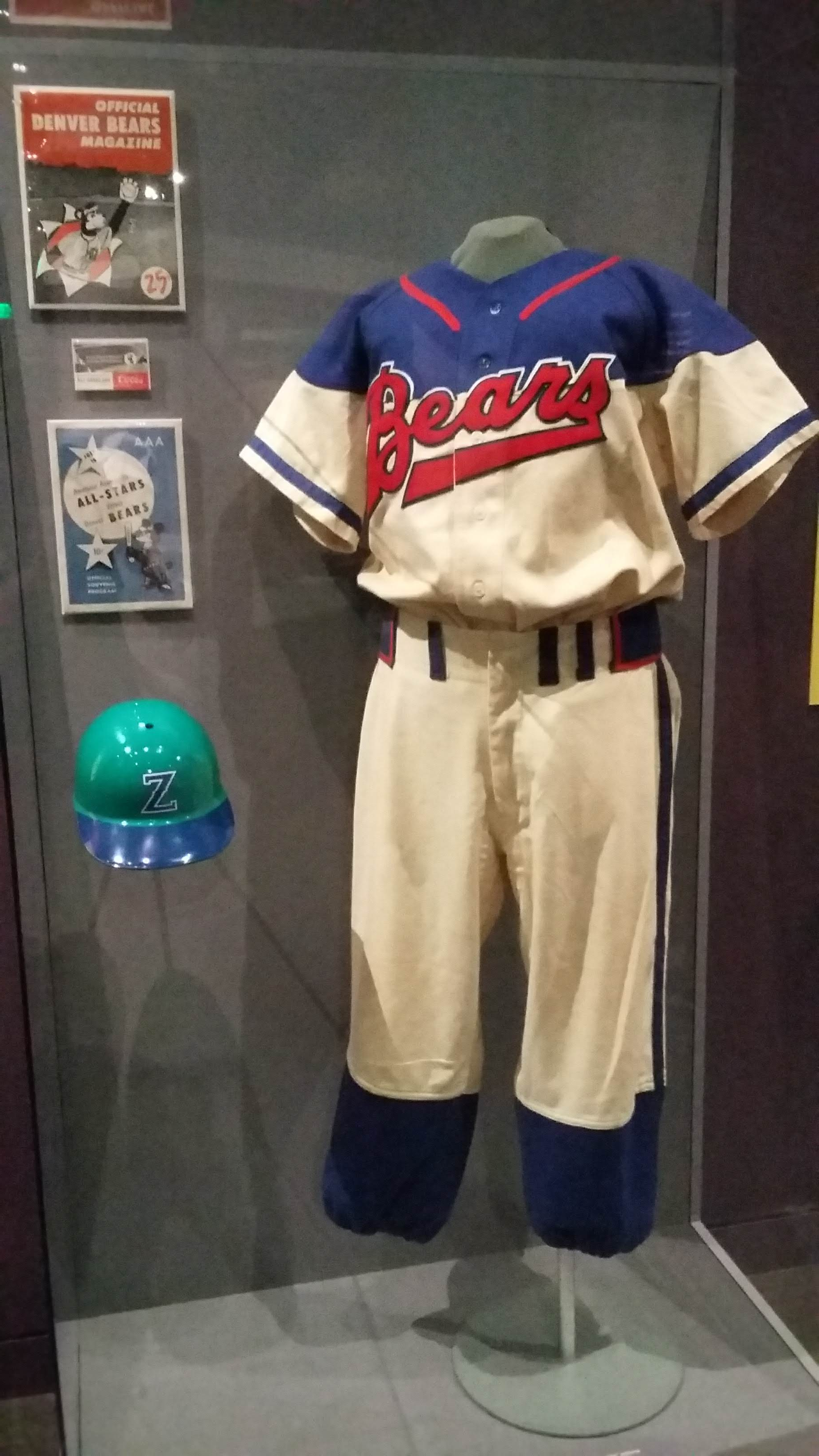
A Denver Bears uniform

Although naming a team for its uniform color had been popular in the 19th century, it was not fashionable in the 20th. As Denver had no connection to the original Blues, and in recognition of the new location in the Rockies, the team became known as the Bears.

The new Denver team played at what became known later as Mile High Stadium, but was originally known as Bears Stadium, after the team. This ballpark was one of the largest venues in history to host minor league baseball on a routine basis, and had the additional draw of being in one of the largest minor league markets at the time. For many years, the biggest crowds were on Independence Day fireworks nights, and the American Association scheduled the Bears for a home game every year. It was on these nights that the Bears drew the largest crowds in minor league baseball history. On July 4, 1982, the Bears drew an all-time minor league record of 65,666 for a game against the Omaha Royals, breaking their own record of 59,691 set on July 4 of the previous year.

The Triple-A Bears were affiliated with the New York Yankees at the outset, with Ralph Houk managing many players who would reach the majors and play in the World Series. The team had some early success, winning the American Association championship in 1957. League MVPs in this period included Marv Throneberry in 1956 and Steve Boros in 1960.

Although the team had been a member of the American Association since the league's inception 60 years before, it was a Midwestern circuit, so for the 1963 season, the Bears transferred to the Pacific Coast League. The mid-1960s Bears included such future big-leaguers as César Tovar and Ted Uhlaender, but lacked overall success. It also turned out that with the PCL otherwise all but confined to the actual Pacific Coast, Denver was now located too far east. In 1969, the franchise returned to the American Association.

The Denver Bears had some good teams from the 1970s to the mid-1980s, producing such players as Andre Dawson, Tim Wallach, Warren Cromartie, Tim Raines, Graig Nettles, Terry Francona, Wallace Johnson, Danny Morris, Pat Rooney, and Bill Gullickson. Denver players Richie Scheinblum (1971), Cliff Johnson (1973), Roger Freed (1976), Frank Ortenzio (1977), and Randy Bass (1980) were league MVPs. The managing careers of both Billy Martin and Felipe Alou began with the Bears. The team won the Association's championship with some regularity, topping the league in 1971, 1976, 1977, 1981, and 1983. The 1980 Bears were recognized as one of the 100 greatest minor league teams of all time.

=== Denver Zephyrs (1984–1992) ===
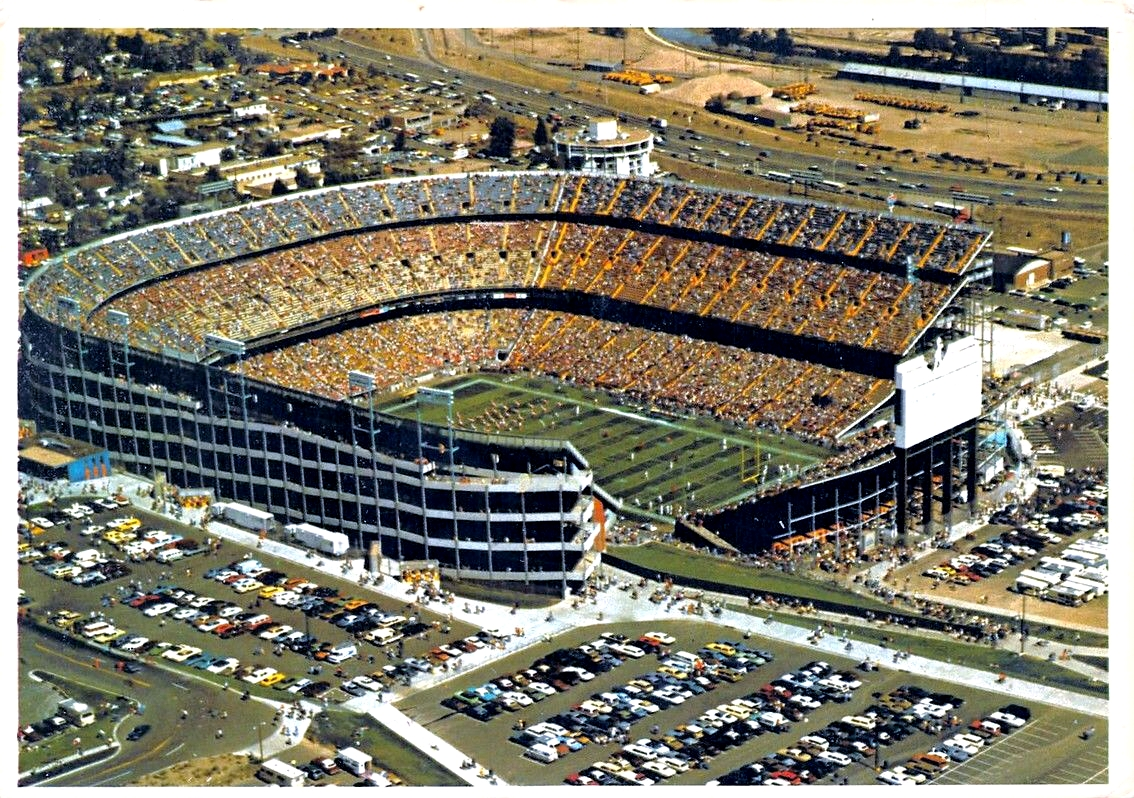
The Zephyrs played at Mile High Stadium, shown here configured for an NFL game.

In 1984, the team name was changed to the Denver Zephyrs, after the famous passenger train. Barry Larkin (1986) was league MVP while with the Zephyrs, as were Greg Vaughn (1989), Jim Olander (1991), and Jim Tatum (1992). ESPN broadcaster Orestes Destrade also played for the Zephyrs. On June 3, 1987, Zephyrs player Joey Meyer hit the longest verified home run in American professional baseball history at 582 feet.

The Zephyrs' only championship under the new nickname was the 1991 American Association title. They went on to win the 1991 Triple-A Classic against the International League's Columbus Clippers, 4–1.

Major League Baseball came to Denver with the arrival of the Colorado Rockies expansion team of the National League in 1993. After 39 seasons of play, the Zephyrs moved to New Orleans, Louisiana, after the 1992 season where they continued as the New Orleans Zephyrs.

== Notable players ==
- Narciso Elvira - played with the Zephyrs after his stint in the Major League Baseball with the Milwaukee Brewers in 1990
- Joey Meyer - holds the record for the longest home run in professional baseball history at 582 feet (177 m), which he hit June 3, 1987, at Denver's Mile High Stadium

== See also ==
- Category:Denver Bears players
- Category:Denver Zephyrs players
