= Wichita Aeros =

- 1970–1984; Wichita, Kansas

Minor league affiliations
- Class: Triple-A (1970–1984)
- League: American Association (1970–1984)

Major league affiliations
- Team: Cincinnati Reds (1984); Montreal Expos (1982–1983); Texas Rangers (1981); Chicago Cubs (1972–1980); Cleveland Indians (1970–1971)

Team data
- Name: Wichita Aeros (1970–1984)
- Ballpark: Lawrence–Dumont Stadium (1970–1984)

The Wichita Aeros were an American minor league baseball franchise based in Wichita, Kansas, that played in the Triple-A American Association from 1970 through 1984.

The Aeros were established as an expansion franchise when the Association grew from six to eight clubs after the 1969 season. They were affiliated with the Cleveland Indians (1970–71), Chicago Cubs (1972–80), Texas Rangers (1981), Montreal Expos (1982–83) and Cincinnati Reds (1984). The Aeros led the league in attendance in 1970 and from 1972–74, but a series of last-place teams during their years as a Cubs farm club drove down attendance throughout the rest of the 1970s. The Aeros won only one division title, and no league championships, during their 15-year history. Milton Glickman, father of former US Secretary of Agriculture Dan Glickman and grandfather of film producer Jonathan Glickman, owned the team from 1970–1984. Glickman sold the team to Robert E. Rich Jr. in 1984.

On September 14, 1984, the Aeros were transferred to Buffalo, New York, and became the Buffalo Bisons, who are now members of the International League. The Bisons had existed in some form since the 1870s and (at the time playing at the Double-A level) used the Aeros' franchise to return to Triple-A baseball. In 1987, the Beaumont Golden Gators of the Double-A Texas League transferred to Wichita and remained there through the 2007 season as the Wranglers. The Wranglers moved to Springdale, Arkansas, in 2008. Wichita's current team is the Wind Surge of the Texas League. The Wingnuts of the independent league baseball incarnation of the American Association played in Wichita between 2008 and 2019.

== Notable alumni ==
- Buddy Bell
- Tom Browning
- Ray Burris
- Bill Caudill
- Chris Chambliss
- Eric Davis
- John Franco
- Mark Gilbert
- Larry Gura
- Pete LaCock
- John Lowenstein
- Donnie Moore
- Bill North
- Paul Reuschel
- Rick Reuschel
- Richie Scheinblum
- Lee Smith †
- Bruce Sutter †
- Dick Tidrow
- Don Werner

† – Member of the National Baseball Hall of Fame and Museum
