= List of Minor League Baseball lists =

This is a list of articles which are themselves or contain substantial lists currently or formerly associated with Minor League Baseball.

== Topics ==
=== Accomplishments ===
- American Association no-hitters
- International League no-hitters
- Nashville Sounds no-hitters
- Nashville Sounds records
- Nashville Vols no-hitters
- Oakland Oaks no-hitters
- Pacific Coast League no-hitters
- Pacific Coast League records
- Rochester Red Wings no-hitters
- San Francisco Seals no-hitters
- Southern League no-hitters
- Toronto Maple Leafs no-hitters

=== Awards ===
- All-Star Futures Game
- Double-A All-Star Game
- Triple-A All-Star Game
- Nashville Sounds awards, All-Stars, and league leaders
- Nashville Vols awards, All-Stars, and league leaders

=== Champions ===
- American Association
- Appalachian League
- Arizona Complex League
- California League
- Carolina League
- Dixie Series
- Dominican Summer League
- Eastern League
- Florida State League
- Interleague minor league postseason series
- International League
- Junior World Series
- Midwest League
- New York–Penn League
- Northwest League
- Pacific Coast League
- Pioneer League
- Serie del Rey
- South Atlantic League
- Southern Association
- Southern League
- Texas League
- Thruway Cup
- Triple-A Classic
- Triple-A National Championship Game
- Triple-A World Series

=== Halls of fame ===
- Appalachian League
- Arizona Fall League
- Buffalo Bisons
- California League
- Florida State League
- International League
- New York–Penn League
- Pacific Coast League
- South Atlantic League
- Southern League
- Syracuse Chiefs/SkyChiefs
- Texas League

=== Personnel (off-field) ===
- Double-A owners
- High-A owners
- International League owners
- Nashville Sounds broadcasters
- Nashville Sounds owners and executives
- Nashville Vols presidents
- Pacific Coast League owners
- Pioneer League owners
- Single-A owners

=== Personnel (on-field) ===
- Columbus Clippers managers
- Memphis Chicks managers
- Nashville Sounds coaches
- Nashville Sounds managers
- Nashville Vols managers
- Scranton/Wilkes-Barre Highlanders managers

=== Player rosters ===
- Arizona Diamondbacks
- Atlanta Braves
- Baltimore Orioles
- Boston Red Sox
- Chicago Cubs
- Chicago White Sox
- Cincinnati Reds
- Cleveland Guardians
- Colorado Rockies
- Detroit Tigers
- Houston Astros
- Kansas City Royals
- Los Angeles Angels
- Los Angeles Dodgers
- Miami Marlins
- Milwaukee Brewers
- Minnesota Twins
- New York Mets
- New York Yankees
- Oakland Athletics
- Philadelphia Phillies
- Pittsburgh Pirates
- San Diego Padres
- San Francisco Giants
- Seattle Mariners
- St. Louis Cardinals
- Tampa Bay Rays
- Texas Rangers
- Toronto Blue Jays
- Washington Nationals

=== Seasons ===
- Eastern League
- Akron RubberDucks
- Buffalo Bisons
- Columbus Clippers
- Gwinnett Stripers
- Harrisburg Senators
- Huntsville Stars
- Lehigh Valley IronPigs
- Louisville Bats
- Memphis Chicks
- Memphis Redbirds
- Nashville Sounds
- Nashville Vols
- Omaha Storm Chasers
- Scranton/Wilkes-Barre Highlanders
- Vancouver Canadians

=== Stadiums ===
- American Association
- Arizona Complex League
- Arizona Fall League
- California League
- Carolina League
- Double-A
- Eastern League
- Florida Complex League
- Florida State League
- High-A
- International League
- Mexican League
- Midwest League
- Northwest League
- Pacific Coast League
- Rookie
- Single-A
- South Atlantic League
- Southern League
- Texas League
- Triple-A

=== Team rosters ===
- All-Star Futures Game all-time
- Arizona Complex League
- Arizona Fall League
- California League
- Carolina League
- Dominican Summer League
- Eastern League
- Florida Complex League
- Florida State League
- International League
- Mexican League
- Midwest League
- Nashville Sounds all-time
- Nashville Vols all-time
- Northwest League
- Pacific Coast League
- South Atlantic League
- Southern League
- Texas League

=== Teams (historical) ===
- American Association
- Eastern League
- International League
- Pacific Coast League
- Southern League
- Texas League

== Classes ==
=== Double-A ===
- All-Star Game
- Owners
- Stadiums
- Teams

=== High-A ===
- Owners
- Stadiums
- Teams

=== Rookie ===
- Stadiums
- Teams

=== Single-A ===
- Owners
- Stadiums
- Teams

=== Triple-A ===
- All-Star Game
- Classic
- Junior World Series
- National Championship Game
- Stadiums
- Teams
- World Series

== Leagues ==
=== American Association ===
- Champions
- Junior World Series
- No-hitters
- Stadiums
- Teams
- Triple-A Classic
- Triple-A World Series

=== Appalachian League ===
- Champions
- Hall of Fame

=== Arizona Complex League ===
- Champions
- Stadiums
- Team rosters

=== Arizona Fall League ===
- Hall of Fame
- Stadiums
- Team rosters

=== California League ===
- Champions
- Hall of Fame
- Owners
- Stadiums
- Team rosters

=== Carolina League ===
- Champions
- Owners
- Stadiums
- Team rosters

=== Dominican Summer League ===
- Champions
- Team rosters

=== Eastern League ===
- Champions
- Owners
- Seasons
- Stadiums
- Team rosters
- Teams

=== Florida Complex League ===
- Stadiums
- Team rosters

=== Florida State League ===
- Champions
- Hall of Fame
- Owners
- Stadiums
- Team rosters

=== International League ===
- Champions
- Hall of Fame
- Junior World Series
- No-hitters
- Owners
- Stadiums
- Team rosters
- Teams
- Thruway Cup
- Triple-A Classic
- Triple-A National Championship Game
- Triple-A World Series

=== Mexican League ===
- Stadiums
- Team rosters

=== Midwest League ===
- Champions
- Owners
- Stadiums
- Team rosters

=== New York–Penn League ===
- Champions
- Hall of Fame

=== Northwest League ===
- Champions
- Owners
- Stadiums
- Team rosters

=== Pacific Coast League ===
- Champions
- Hall of Fame
- Junior World Series
- No-hitters
- Owners
- Records
- Stadiums
- Team rosters
- Teams
- Triple-A National Championship Game
- Triple-A World Series

=== Pioneer League ===
- Champions
- Owners

=== South Atlantic League ===
- Champions
- Hall of Fame
- Owners
- Stadiums
- Team rosters

=== Southern Association ===
- Dixie Series
- Champions

=== Southern League ===
- Champions
- Dixie Series
- Hall of Fame
- No-hitters
- Owners
- Stadiums
- Team rosters
- Teams

=== Texas League ===
- Champions
- Dixie Series
- Hall of Fame
- Owners
- Stadiums
- Team rosters
- Teams

== Teams ==
=== Akron RubberDucks ===
- Seasons

=== Buffalo Bisons ===
- Hall of Fame
- Seasons

=== Columbus Clippers ===
- Managers
- Seasons

=== Gwinnett Stripers ===
- Seasons

=== Harrisburg Senators ===
- Seasons

=== Huntsville Stars ===
- Seasons

=== Lehigh Valley IronPigs ===
- Seasons

=== Louisville Bats ===
- Seasons

=== Memphis Chicks ===
- Managers
- Seasons

=== Memphis Redbirds ===
- Seasons

=== Nashville Sounds ===
- Awards, All-Stars, and league leaders
- Broadcasters
- Coaches
- Managers
- No-hitters
- Owners and executives
- Records
- Roster
- Seasons

=== Nashville Vols ===
- Awards, All-Stars, and league leaders
- Managers
- No-hitters
- Presidents
- Roster
- Seasons

=== Oakland Oaks ===
- No-hitters

=== Omaha Storm Chasers ===
- Seasons

=== Rochester Red Wings ===
- No-hitters

=== San Francisco Seals ===
- No-hitters

=== Scranton/Wilkes-Barre Highlanders ===
- Seasons
- No-hitters
- Managers

=== Syracuse Chiefs/SkyChiefs ===
- Wall of Fame

=== Toronto Maple Leafs ===
- No-hitters

=== Vancouver Canadians ===
- Seasons

== See also ==
- Minor League Baseball leagues and teams
- Developmental and minor sports leagues
