= List of Akron RubberDucks seasons =

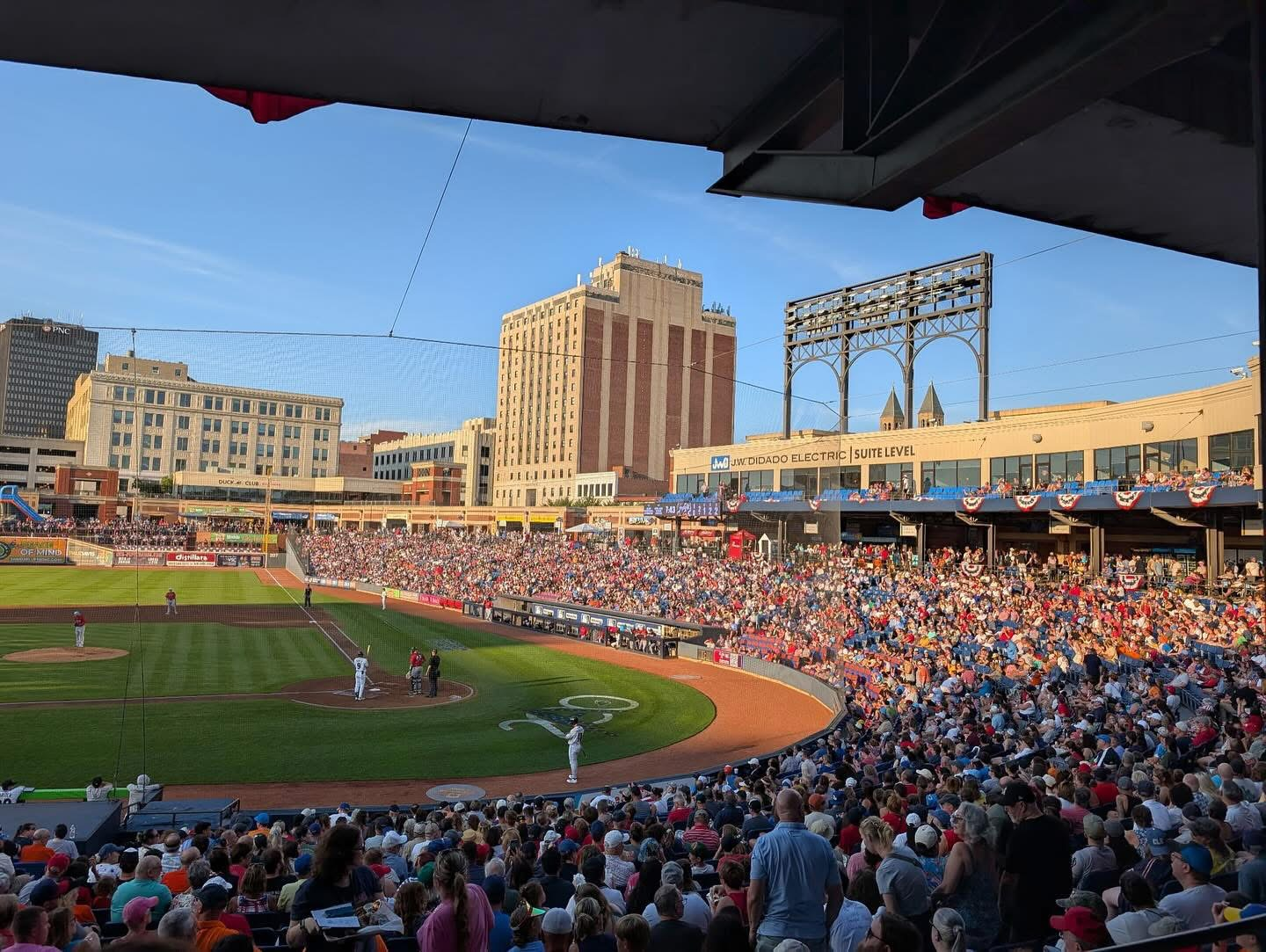
7 17 Credit Union Park, the RubberDucks' home stadium

The Akron RubberDucks minor league baseball franchise has played 44 seasons (all in the Eastern League; all as a Double-A affiliate of an MLB team) since its inception in Lynn, Massachusetts in the 1980 season. As of the completion of the 2024 season, the club has played in 6,153 regular season games with an overall win–loss record of 3,275–2,878. The team has also compiled a postseason win-loss record of 100–78 in 178 games.

== Franchise history (1980–present) ==
Clinched Post-season Berth (1980–present) ♦	Advanced to Championship Round (1980–present) †	League champions (1980–present) or League Champions and Division Champions (1980–1982; 1994–present) ‡

Year	Record^{[a]}	Win %	League^{[b]}	Division^{[c]}	GB^{[d]}	Post-season record^{[e]}	Post-season win %	Result	MLB affiliate
1980 Lynn Sailors	66–71	.482	6th	3rd	11	–	–	–	Seattle Mariners
1981 Lynn Sailors	62–76	.449	6th	3rd	22½	–	–	–	Seattle Mariners
1982 Lynn Sailors ♦ †	82–57	.590	2nd	1st	—	2–3	.400	Defeated Glens Falls White Sox 2–0 in first round Lost to West Haven A's 0–3 in championship series	Seattle Mariners
1983 Lynn Sailors ♦ †	77–62	.554	2nd	n/a	18½	3–3	.500	Defeated Buffalo 2–0 in first round Lost to New Britain 1–3 in championship series	Pittsburgh Pirates
1984 Vermont Reds ♦ ‡	75–65	.536	4th	n/a	7	6–2	.750	Defeated Albany-Colonie Yankees 3–0 in first round Defeated Waterbury Angels 3–2 in championship series	Cincinnati Reds
1985 Vermont Reds ♦ ‡	71–67	.514	4th	n/a	10½	6–2	.750	Defeated Albany-Colonie Yankees 3–1 in first round Defeated Waterbury Angels 3–2 in championship series	Cincinnati Reds
1986 Vermont Reds ♦ ‡	77–62	.554	2nd	n/a	1½	6–4	.600	Defeated Pittsfield Cubs 3–2 in first round Defeated Reading Phillies 3–2 in championship series	Cincinnati Reds
1987 Vermont Reds ♦ †	73–67	.521	4th	n/a	15	4–4	.500	Defeated Pittsfield Cubs 3–1 in first round Lost to Harrisburg Senators 1–3 in championship series	Cincinnati Reds
1988 Vermont Mariners ♦ †	79–60	.568	2nd	n/a	2	4–4	.500	Defeated Pittsfield Cubs 3–1 in first round Lost to Albany-Colonie Yankees 1–3 in championship series	Seattle Mariners
1989 Canton–Akron Indians ♦	70–69	.504	3rd	n/a	21½	2–3	.400	Lost to Harrisburg Senators 2–3 in first round	Cleveland Indians
1990 Canton–Akron Indians ♦	76–64	.543	3rd	n/a	3½	2–3	.400	Lost to London Tigers 2–3 in first round	Cleveland Indians
1991 Canton–Akron Indians ♦	75–65	.536	4th	n/a	12	1–3	.250	Lost to Harrisburg Senators 2–3 in first round	Cleveland Indians
1992 Canton–Akron Indians ♦ †	80–58	.580	1st	n/a	—	5–3	.625	Defeated Albany-Colonie Yankees 3–0 in first round Lost to Binghamton Mets 2–3 in championship series	Cleveland Indians
1993 Canton–Akron Indians ♦ †	75–63	.543	2nd	n/a	19	5–5	.500	Defeated Bowie Baysox 3–2 in first round Lost to Harrisburg Senators 2–3 in championship series	Cleveland Indians
1994 Canton–Akron Indians	69–73	.486	6th	3rd	20½	–	–	–	Cleveland Indians
1995 Canton–Akron Indians	67–75	.472	7th (tie)	4th	6	–	–	–	Cleveland Indians
1996 Canton–Akron Indians	71–71	.500	6th	3rd	15	–	–	–	Cleveland Indians
1997 Akron Aeros	51–90	.362	10th	5th	34½	–	–	–	Cleveland Indians
1998 Akron Aeros ♦	81–60	.574	3rd	1st	—	1–3	.250	Lost to Harrisburg Senators 1–3 in first round	Cleveland Indians
1999 Akron Aeros	69–71	.493	7th	5th	11	–	–	–	Cleveland Indians
2000 Akron Aeros	75–68	.524	6th	3rd	10½	–	–	–	Cleveland Indians
2001 Akron Aeros	68–74	.479	7th	3rd	16	–	–	–	Cleveland Indians
2002 Akron Aeros ♦	93–48	.660	1st	1st	—	2–3	.400	Lost to Harrisburg Senators 2–3 in first round	Cleveland Indians
2003 Akron Aeros ♦ ‡	88–53	.624	1st	1st	—	6–1	.857	Defeated Altoona Curve 3–1 in first round Defeated New Haven Ravens 3–0 in championship series	Cleveland Indians
2004 Akron Aeros	63–78	.447	11th	5th	22	–	–	–	Cleveland Indians
2005 Akron Aeros ♦ ‡	84–58	.592	1st	1st	—	6–3	.667	Defeated Altoona Curve 3–2 in first round Defeated Portland Sea Dogs 3–2 in championship series	Cleveland Indians
2006 Akron Aeros ♦ †	87–55	.613	1st	1st	—	5–5	.500	Defeated Altoona Curve 3–1 in first round Lost to Portland Sea Dogs 2–3 in championship series	Cleveland Indians
2007 Akron Aeros ♦ †	80–61	.567	3rd	2nd	1½	4–4	.500	Defeated Erie SeaWolves 3–1 in first round Lost to Trenton Thunder 1–3 in championship series	Cleveland Indians
2008 Akron Aeros ♦ †	80–62	.563	3rd	2nd	4	4–4	.500	Defeated Bowie Baysox 3–1 in first round Lost to Trenton Thunder 1–3 in championship series	Cleveland Indians
2009 Akron Aeros ♦ ‡	89–53	.627	1st	1st	—	6–1	.857	Defeated Reading Phillies 3–0 in first round Defeated Connecticut Defenders 3–1 in championship series	Cleveland Indians
2010 Akron Aeros	71–71	.500	6th	4th	11	–	–	–	Cleveland Indians
2011 Akron Aeros	73–69	.514	6th	4th	7	–	–	–	Cleveland Indians
2012 Akron Aeros ♦ ‡	82–59	.582	1st	1st	—	6–3	.667	Defeated Bowie Baysox 3–2 in first round Defeated Trenton Thunder 3–1 in championship series	Cleveland Indians
2013 Akron Aeros	68–73	.482	8th (tie)	6th	8.5	–	–	–	Cleveland Indians
2014 Akron RubberDucks ♦	73–69	.514	4th (tie)	2nd	6	1–3	.250	Lost to Richmond Flying Squirrels 1–3 in first round	Cleveland Indians
2015 Akron RubberDucks	73–69	.514	6th	4th	6	–	–	–	Cleveland Indians
2016 Akron RubberDucks ♦ ‡	77–64	.546	3rd	1st	—	6–1	.857	Defeated Altoona Curve 3–1 in first round Defeated Trenton Thunder 3–0 in championship series	Cleveland Indians
2017 Akron RubberDucks	69–71	.493	6th	3rd	5	–	–	–	Cleveland Indians
2018 Akron RubberDucks ♦ †	78–62	.557	3rd	2nd	1	3–4	.429	Defeated Altoona Curve 3–1 in first round Lost to New Hampshire Fisher Cats 0–3 in championship series	Cleveland Indians
2019 Akron RubberDucks	61–79	.436	11th	5th	17	–	–	–	Cleveland Indians
2021 Akron RubberDucks ♦ ‡	73–46	.613	1st	1st	—	3–0	1.000	Defeated Bowie Baysox 3–0 in championship series	Cleveland Indians
2022 Akron RubberDucks	79–59	.572	3rd	2nd	1	–	–	–	Cleveland Guardians
2023 Akron RubberDucks	65–73	.471	8th	5th	10.5	–	–	–	Cleveland Guardians
2024 Akron RubberDucks ♦	80–58	.580	1st	1st	—	1–2	.333	Lost to Erie SeaWolves 1–2 in first round	Cleveland Guardians

=== Franchise totals (1980–present) ===
Franchise totals
Team	Affiliate	Regular season		Postseason	
Team	Affiliate	Record^{[a]}	Win %	Record^{[e]}	Win %
Lynn Sailors (1980–1982)	Seattle Mariners	210–204	.507	2–3	.400
Lynn Sailors (1983)	Pittsburgh Pirates	77–62	.554	3–3	.500
Vermont Reds (1984–1987)	Cincinnati Reds	296–261	.531	22–12	.647
Vermont Mariners (1988)	Seattle Mariners	79–60	.568	4–4	.500
Canton–Akron Indians (1989–1996)	Cleveland Indians	583–538	.520	15–17	.469
Akron Aeros (1997–2013)	Cleveland Indians	1,302–1,103	.541	40–27	.597
Akron RubberDucks (2014–present)	Cleveland Guardians	728–650	.528	14–10	.583
		3,275–2,878	.532	100–78	.562

==== Notes ====
- ^{a} This column indicates wins and losses during the regular season and excludes any postseason play.
- ^{b} This column indicates position in the league standings.
- ^{c} This column indicates position in the divisional standings, if applicable.
- ^{d} Determined by finding the difference in wins plus the difference in losses divided by two, this column indicates "games behind" the team that finished in first place in the division. From 1983 to 1993, when the Eastern League was not split into two divisions, this column indicates games behind the team that finished first place in the league.
- ^{e} This column indicates wins and losses during the postseason.
