= List of Lehigh Valley IronPigs seasons =

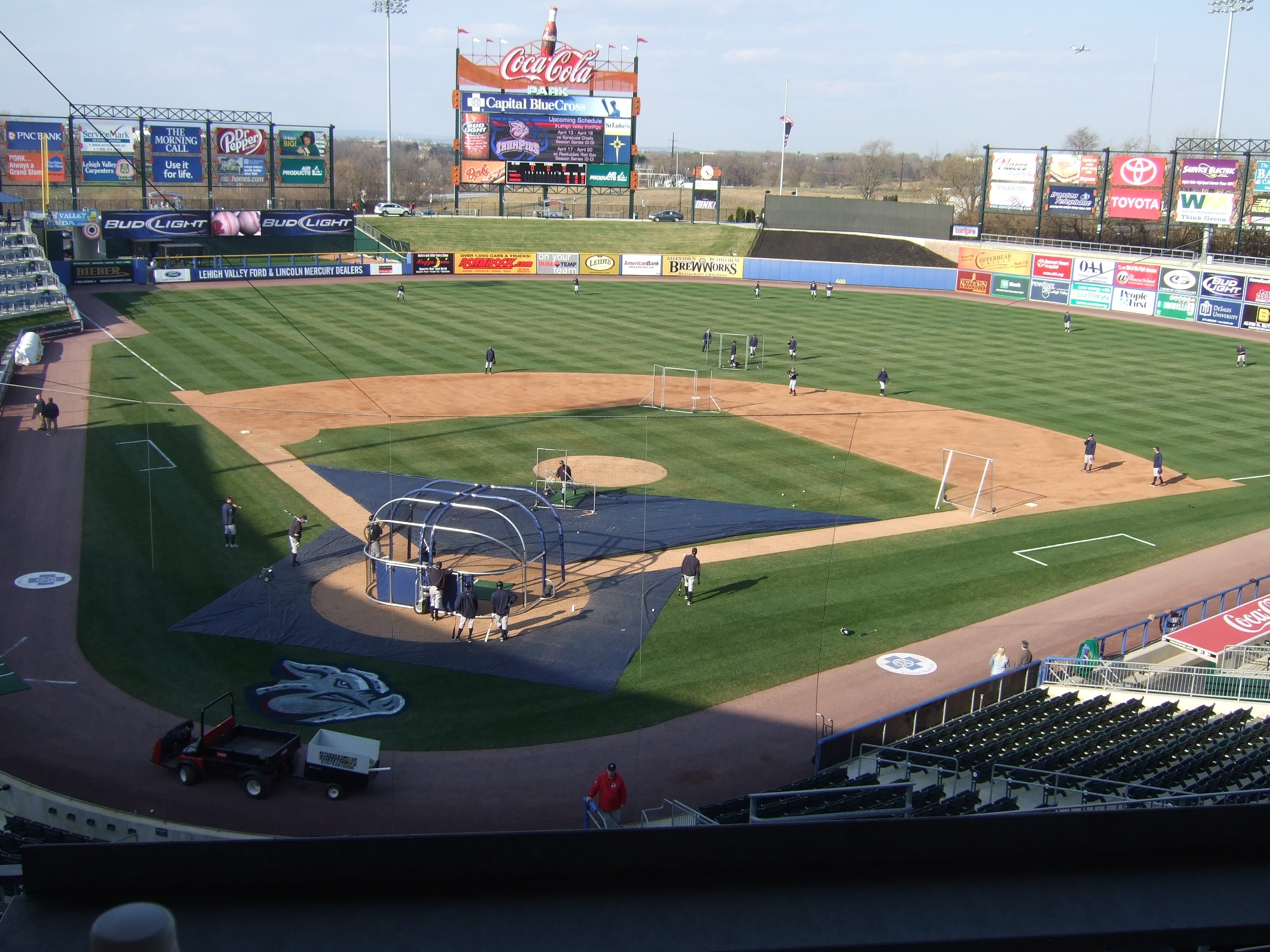
The Lehigh Valley IronPigs have played at Coca-Cola Park since 2008.

The Lehigh Valley IronPigs are a Minor League Baseball team that plays in the Lehigh Valley region of Pennsylvania. Founded as members of the Triple-A classification International League (IL) in 2008, the IronPigs have been affiliated with the Philadelphia Phillies since their inception. The IronPigs have played at Coca-Cola Park in Allentown, Pennsylvania, since their inaugural season. In conjunction with the 2021 restructuring of the minor leagues, Lehigh Valley was placed in the new Triple-A East (AAAE) in 2021, but this league was renamed the International League in 2022.

The team has played 2,581 regular-season games and compiled a win–loss record of 1,287–1,294, resulting in a winning percentage of .499. The IronPigs' best regular-season record occurred in 2018 when they finished 84–56 (.600). Conversely, their worst record was 55–89 (.382), which they recorded in 2008, their inaugural season.

Lehigh Valley has appeared in only one International League championship (2011) and has claimed one division title (2018), along with three wild card playoff berths. The team struggled in its early years, finishing last, or second-to-last in the division twice in its first three seasons. However, under manager Dave Brundage (2013–2016) and later Gary Jones (2018–2019, 2021), the IronPigs became a playoff contender for a while, partaking in three consecutive playoff appearances, losing to the Scranton/Wilkes-Barre RailRiders each time.

== Season-by-season records ==
Table key
League	The team's final position in the league standings
Division	The team's final position in the divisional standings
GB	Games behind the team that finished in first place in the division that season
‡	Class champions (2008–present)
†	League champions (2008–present)
*	Division champions (2008–present)
^	Postseason berth (2008–present)

Season-by-season records
Season	League	Regular-season					Postseason			MLB affiliate	Ref.
Season	League	Record	Win %	League	Division	GB	Record	Win %	Result	MLB affiliate	Ref.
2008	IL	55–89	.382	14th	6th	33	—	—	—	Philadelphia Phillies	
2009	IL	71–73	.493	8th	3rd	11 1/2	—	—	—	Philadelphia Phillies	
2010	IL	58–86	.403	13th	5th	29 1/2	—	—	—	Philadelphia Phillies	
2011^	IL	80–64	.556	4th	2nd	2	4–3	.571	Won wild card berth Won semifinals vs. Pawtucket Red Sox, 3–0; Lost IL championship vs. Columbus Clippers, 3–1	Philadelphia Phillies	
2012	IL	75–68	.524	5th	3rd	8 1/2	—	—	—	Philadelphia Phillies	
2013	IL	72–72	.500	7th	4th	8 1/2	—	—	—	Philadelphia Phillies	
2014	IL	66–78	.458	11th	6th	15 1/2	—	—	—	Philadelphia Phillies	
2015	IL	63–81	.438	12th	5th	18	—	—	—	Philadelphia Phillies	
2016^	IL	85–58	.594	2nd	2nd	6	0–3	.000	Won wild card berth Lost semifinals vs. Scranton/Wilkes-Barre RailRiders, 3–0	Philadelphia Phillies	
2017^	IL	80–62	.563	3rd (tie)	2nd (tie)	6 1/2	1–3	.250	Won wild card berth Lost semifinals vs. Scranton/Wilkes-Barre RailRiders, 3–1	Philadelphia Phillies	
2018 *	IL	84–56	.600	1st	1st	—	1–3	.250	Won Northern Division title Lost semifinals vs. Scranton/Wilkes-Barre RailRiders, 3–1	Philadelphia Phillies	
2019	IL	66–74	.471	9th (tie)	5th	9 1/2	—	—	—	Philadelphia Phillies	
2020	IL	Season cancelled (COVID-19 pandemic)								Philadelphia Phillies	
2021	AAAE	53–75 (Note: In 2021, the team with the best record at the end of the regular-season was declared the Triple-A East champion. Lehigh Valley had a 52–66 (.441) record, 24 games behind first place, which put them 14th in the league and 4th in their division. The regular-season was followed by the Triple-A Final Stretch, a 10-game postseason tournament in which all 30 Triple-A clubs competed for the highest winning percentage. Lehigh Valley finished the tournament in 30th place with a 1–9 (.100) record.)	.414	15th	4th	27	—	—	—	Philadelphia Phillies	
2022	IL	76–72	.514	7th (tie)	4th (tie)	9	—	—	—	Philadelphia Phillies	
2023	IL	80–66	.548	6th	3rd	8 1/2	—	—	—	Philadelphia Phillies	
2024	IL	68–78	.466	14th	7th	19 1/2	—	—	—	Philadelphia Phillies	
2025	IL	87-61	.588	3rd	3rd	1	—	—	—	Philadelphia Phillies	
2026	IL	68–81	.456	15th	8th	22 1/2	—	—	—	Philadelphia Phillies	
Totals	—	1,287–1,294	.499	—	—	—	6–12	.333	—	—	—

== Franchise totals ==
=== By classification ===
Franchise totals by classification
Classification	Regular-season		Postseason			Composite	
Classification	Record	Win %	Apps.	Record	Win %	Record	Win %
Triple-A (2008–2026)	1,287–1,294	.499	4	6–12	.333	1,293–1,306	.497
All-time	1,287–1,294	.499	4	6–12	.333	1,293–1,306	.497

=== By league ===
Franchise totals by league
League	Regular-season		Postseason			Composite	
League	Record	Win %	Apps.	Record	Win %	Record	Win %
Triple-A East / IL (2008–2026)	1,287–1,294	.499	4	6–12	.333	1,293–1,306	.497
All-time	1,287–1,294	.499	4	6–12	.333	1,293–1,306	.497

=== By affiliation ===
Franchise totals by affiliation
Affiliation	Regular-season		Postseason			Composite	
Affiliation	Record	Win %	Apps.	Record	Win %	Record	Win %
Philadelphia Phillies (2008–2026)	1,287–1,294	.499	4	6–12	.333	1,293–1,306	.497
All-time	1,287–1,294	.499	4	6–12	.333	1,293–1,306	.497
