= List of Eastern League seasons =

A list of Eastern League seasons since inception of the league:

== See also ==
- List of Eastern League champions
