= List of Gwinnett Stripers seasons =

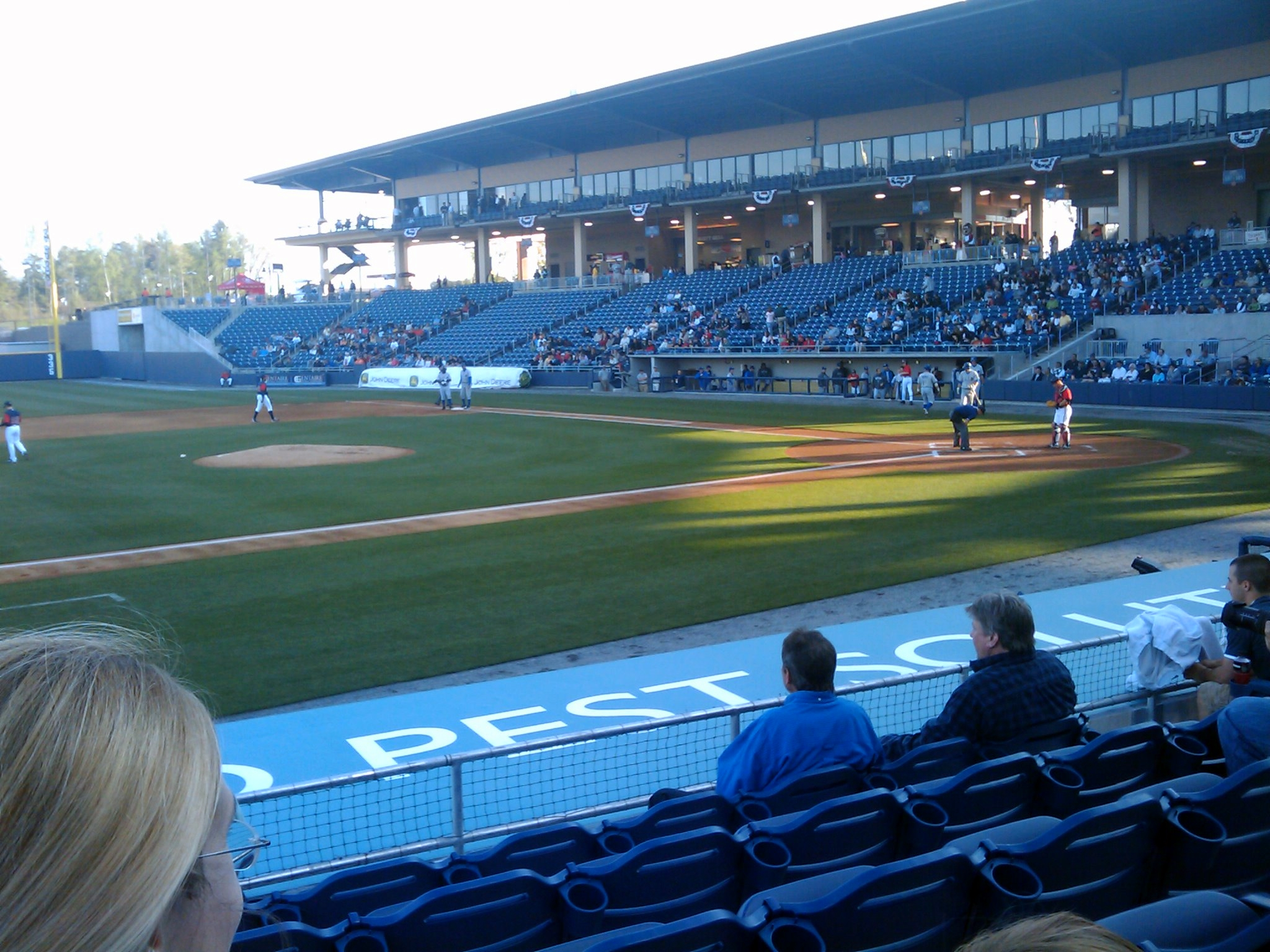
The Gwinnett Stripers have played at Coolray Field since 2009.

The Gwinnett Stripers are a Minor League Baseball team that plays in Lawrenceville, Georgia. Founded as members of the Triple-A classification International League (IL) in 2009, the Stripers have been affiliated with the Atlanta Braves since their inception, but were originally known as the Gwinnett Braves (2009–2018). The Stripers have played at Coolray Field since their inaugural season. In conjunction with the 2021 restructuring of the minor leagues, Gwinnett was placed in the new Triple-A East (AAAE) in 2021, but this league was renamed the International League in 2022.

The team has played 2,441 regular-season games and compiled a win–loss record of 1,202–1,239, resulting in a winning percentage of .492. The Stripers' best regular-season record occurred in 2019 when they finished 80–59 (.576). Conversely, their worst record was 60–84 (.417), which they recorded in 2013.

Gwinnett has made one appearance in the International League championship (2016) and has secured two division titles (2016 and 2019), along with a wild card playoff berth.

== Season-by-season records ==
Table key
League	The team's final position in the league standings
Division	The team's final position in the divisional standings
GB	Games behind the team that finished in first place in the division that season
‡	Class champions (2009–present)
†	League champions (2009–present)
*	Division champions (2009–2022)
^	Postseason berth (2009–present)

Season-by-season records
Season	League	Regular-season					Postseason			MLB affiliate	Ref.
Season	League	Record	Win %	League	Division	GB	Record	Win %	Result	MLB affiliate	Ref.
2009^	IL	81–63	.563	4th	2nd	2	1–3	.250	Won wild card berth Lost semifinals vs. Scranton/Wilkes-Barre Yankees, 3–1	Atlanta Braves	
2010	IL	72–71	.503	7th	2nd	16	—	—	—	Atlanta Braves	
2011	IL	78–65	.545	5th	2nd	2 1/2	—	—	—	Atlanta Braves	
2012	IL	62–82	.431	12th	4th	21	—	—	—	Atlanta Braves	
2013	IL	60–84	.417	14th	4th	27	—	—	—	Atlanta Braves	
2014	IL	65–77	.459	11th (tie)	2nd	9	—	—	—	Atlanta Braves	
2015	IL	77–67	.535	5th (tie)	2nd	1	—	—	—	Atlanta Braves	
2016 *	IL	65–78	.455	10th	1st	—	4–4	.500	Won Southern Division title Won semifinals vs. Columbus Clippers, 3–1; Lost IL championship vs. Scranton/Wilkes-Barre RailRiders, 3–1	Atlanta Braves	
2017	IL	71–71	.500	6th (tie)	2nd	15	—	—	—	Atlanta Braves	
2018	IL	70–69	.504	7th	2nd	9	—	—	—	Atlanta Braves	
2019 *	IL	80–59	.576	2nd	1st	—	1–3	.250	Won Southern Division title Lost semifinals vs. Columbus Clippers, 3–1	Atlanta Braves	
2020	IL	Season cancelled (COVID-19 pandemic)								Atlanta Braves	
2021	AAAE	71–58 (Note: In 2021, the team with the best record at the end of the regular-season was declared the Triple-A East champion. Gwinnett had a 68–51 (.571) record, 8 1/2 games behind first place, which put them 6th in the league and 3rd in their division. The regular-season was followed by the Triple-A Final Stretch, a 10-game postseason tournament in which all 30 Triple-A clubs competed for the highest winning percentage. Gwinnett finished the tournament in 25th place with a 3–7 (.300) record.)	.550	8th	3rd	14 1/2	—	—	—	Atlanta Braves	
2022	IL	69–79	.466	15th	8th	21 1/2	—	—	—	Atlanta Braves	
2023	IL	70–78	.473	12th (tie)	6th (tie)	14	—	—	—	Atlanta Braves	
2024	IL	72–78	.480	11th (tie)	6th	18	—	—	—	Atlanta Braves	
2025	IL	63–87	.420	16th	8th	24 1/2	—	—	—	Atlanta Braves	
2026	IL	76–73	.510	10th	5th	6 1/2	—	—	—	Atlanta Braves	
Totals	—	1,202–1,239	.492	—	—	—	6–10	.375	—	—	—

== Franchise totals ==
=== By classification ===
Franchise totals by classification
Affiliation	Regular-season		Postseason			Composite	
Affiliation	Record	Win %	Apps.	Record	Win %	Record	Win %
Triple-A (2009–2026)	1,202–1,239	.492	3	6–10	.375	1,208–1,249	.492
All-time	1,202–1,239	.492	3	6–10	.346	1,208–1,249	.492

=== By league ===
Franchise totals by league
Affiliation	Regular-season		Postseason			Composite	
Affiliation	Record	Win %	Apps.	Record	Win %	Record	Win %
Triple-A East / IL (2009–2026)	1,202–1,239	.492	3	6–10	.375	1,208–1,249	.492
All-time	1,202–1,239	.492	3	6–10	.346	1,208–1,249	.492

=== By affiliation ===
Franchise totals by affiliation
Affiliation	Regular-season		Postseason			Composite	
Affiliation	Record	Win %	Apps.	Record	Win %	Record	Win %
Atlanta Braves (2009–2026)	1,202–1,239	.492	3	6–10	.375	1,208–1,249	.492
All-time	1,202–1,239	.492	3	6–10	.346	1,208–1,249	.492
