= List of Louisville Bats seasons =

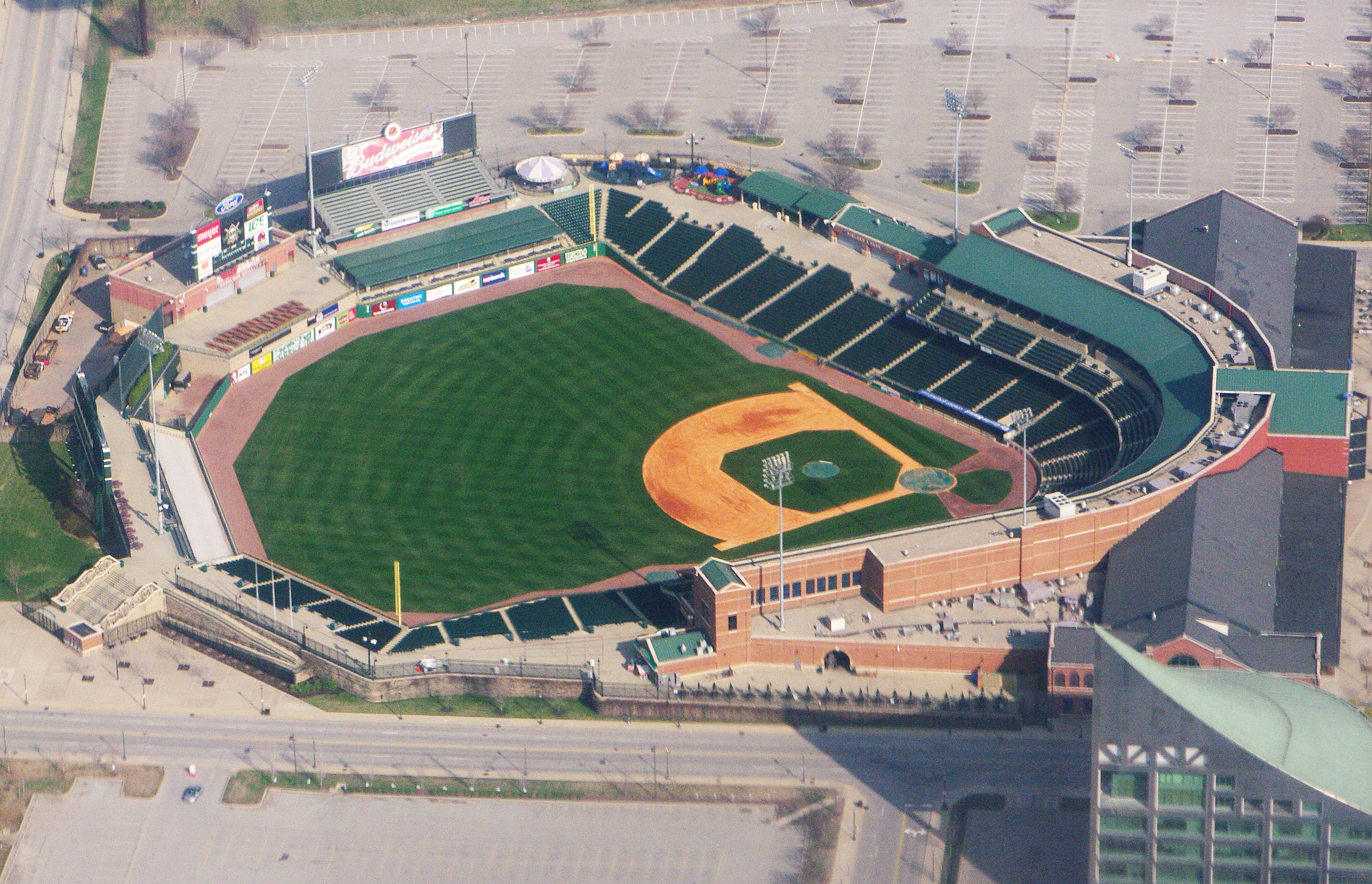
Louisville Slugger Field, home of the Louisville Bats since 2000

The Louisville Bats Minor League Baseball team has played in Louisville, Kentucky, for 44 years since being established in 1982. They began play as members of the American Association (AA) before joining the International League (IL) in 1998. The team has played 6,159 regular-season games and compiled a win-loss record of 3,063–3,244 (.486). The Bats' best regular-season record occurred in 2008 when they finished 88–56 (.611). Conversely, their lowest record was 51–93 (.354) in 2012.

The team has won four league titles: three AA championships (1984, 1985, and 1995) and one IL championship (2001).

== Seasons ==
Key
League	The team's final position in the league standings
Division	The team's final position in the divisional standings
GB	Games behind the team that finished in first place in the division that season
‡	Class champions (1983–present)
†	League champions (1977–present)
*	Division champions (1988–2022)
^	Postseason berth (1977–present)

Season-by-season records
Season	League	Regular-season					Postseason			MLB affiliate	Ref.
Season	League	Record	Win %	League	Division	GB	Record	Win %	Result	MLB affiliate	Ref.
1982	AA	73–62	.541	2nd (tie)	2nd (tie)	1 1/2	—	—	—	St. Louis Cardinals	
1983 *	AA	78–57	.578	1st	1st	—	3–6	.333	Won Eastern Division title Won semifinals vs. Oklahoma City 89ers, 3–2; Lost AA championship vs. Denver Bears, 4–0	St. Louis Cardinals	
1984^ †	AA	79–76	.510	4th	—	12 1/2	8–3	.727	Won semifinals vs. Indianapolis Indians, 4–2; Won AA championship vs. Denver Zephyrs, 4–1	St. Louis Cardinals	
1985 * †	AA	74–68	.521	3rd	1st	—	4–1	.800	Won Eastern Division title Won AA championship vs. Oklahoma City 89ers, 4–1	St. Louis Cardinals	
1986	AA	64–78	.451	7th	4th	16	—	—	—	St. Louis Cardinals	
1987^	AA	78–62	.557	2nd	—	1	2–3	.400	Lost semifinals vs. Indianapolis Indians, 3–2	St. Louis Cardinals	
1988	AA	63–79	.444	8th	4th	26	—	—	—	St. Louis Cardinals	
1989	AA	71–74	.490	5th	4th	15 1/2	—	—	—	St. Louis Cardinals	
1990	AA	74–72	.507	4th	3rd	11 1/2	—	—	—	St. Louis Cardinals	
1991	AA	51–92	.357	8th	4th	30	—	—	—	St. Louis Cardinals	
1992	AA	73–70	.510	4th	3rd	13 1/2	—	—	—	St. Louis Cardinals	
1993	AA	68–76	.472	6th	3rd	13 1/2	—	—	—	St. Louis Cardinals	
1994^	AA	74–68	.521	4th	—	11 1/2	0–3	.000	Lost semifinals vs. Indianapolis Indians, 3–0	St. Louis Cardinals	
1995^ †	AA	74–70	.514	4th	—	14	6–2	.750	Won semifinals vs. Indianapolis Indians, 3–0; Won AA championship vs. Buffalo Bisons, 3–2	St. Louis Cardinals	
1996	AA	60–84	.417	7th	4th	24	—	—	—	St. Louis Cardinals	
1997	AA	58–85	.406	8th	4th	28 1/2	—	—	—	St. Louis Cardinals	
1998 *	IL	77–67	.535	5th	1st	—	0–3	.000	Won Western Division title Lost semifinals vs. Durham Bulls, 3–0	Milwaukee Brewers	
1999	IL	63–81	.438	11th	3rd	21 1/2	—	—	—	Milwaukee Brewers	
2000	IL	71–73	.493	9th	3rd	10	—	—	—	Cincinnati Reds	
2001 * †	IL	84–60	.583	3rd	1st	—	4–2	.667	Won Western Division title Won semifinals vs. Norfolk Tides, 3–2; Won IL championship vs. Scranton/Wilkes-Barre Red Barons, 1–0 (Note: The 2001 playoffs were cancelled in the wake of the September 11 attacks. Louisville, which had won the first game of the series, 2–1, before its cancellation, was declared the winner.)	Cincinnati Reds	
2002	IL	79–65	.549	6th	2nd	2	—	—	—	Cincinnati Reds	
2003 *	IL	79–64	.552	2nd	1st	—	1–3	.250	Won Western Division title Lost semifinals vs. Durham Bulls, 3–1	Cincinnati Reds	
2004	IL	67–77	.465	10th	2nd	13	—	—	—	Cincinnati Reds	
2005	IL	66–78	.458	11th	4th	23	—	—	—	Cincinnati Reds	
2006	IL	75–68	.524	6th	3rd	1 1/2	—	—	—	Cincinnati Reds	
2007	IL	74–70	.514	7th	2nd	8 1/2	—	—	—	Cincinnati Reds	
2008 *	IL	88–56	.611	1st (tie)	1st	—	1–3	.250	Won Western Division title Lost semifinals vs. Durham Bulls, 3–1	Cincinnati Reds	
2009 *	IL	84–58	.592	1st	1st	—	2–3	.400	Won Western Division title Lost semifinals vs. Durham Bulls, 3–2	Cincinnati Reds	
2010 *	IL	79–64	.552	3rd	1st	—	2–3	.400	Won Western Division title Lost semifinals vs. Durham Bulls, 3–2	Cincinnati Reds	
2011	IL	73–71	.507	8th	3rd	15	—	—	—	Cincinnati Reds	
2012	IL	51–93	.354	14th	4th	38	—	—	—	Cincinnati Reds	
2013	IL	69–75	.479	9th	3rd	11	—	—	—	Cincinnati Reds	
2014	IL	68–75	.476	9th	4th	10 1/2	—	—	—	Cincinnati Reds	
2015	IL	64–80	.444	11th	3rd	19	—	—	—	Cincinnati Reds	
2016	IL	71–73	.493	6th	2nd	11	—	—	—	Cincinnati Reds	
2017	IL	56–86	.394	13th	4th	23	—	—	—	Cincinnati Reds	
2018	IL	61–76	.445	13th	4th	11	—	—	—	Cincinnati Reds	
2019	IL	59–81	.421	13th (tie)	4th	22	—	—	—	Cincinnati Reds	
2020	IL	Season cancelled (COVID-19 pandemic)								Cincinnati Reds	
2021	AAAE	55–73 (Note: In 2021, the team with the best record at the end of the regular-season was declared the Triple-A East champion. Louisville had a 51–68 (.429) record, 17 1/2 games behind first place, which put them 15th in the league and 6th in their division. The regular-season was followed by the Triple-A Final Stretch, a 10-game postseason tournament in which all 30 Triple-A clubs competed for the highest winning percentage. Louisville finished the tournament tied for 18th place with a 4–5 (.333) record.)	.430	14th	6th	18	—	—	—	Cincinnati Reds	
2022	IL	60–90	.400	19th	10th	31 1/2	—	—	—	Cincinnati Reds	
2023	IL	75–73	.507	9th	4th	9	—	—	—	Cincinnati Reds	
2024	IL	67–82	.450	20th	10th	22 1/2	—	—	—	Cincinnati Reds	
2025	IL	71–79	.473	12th	6th	16 1/2	—	—	—	Cincinnati Reds	
2026	IL	65–83	.439	18th	9th	17	—	—	—	Cincinnati Reds	
Totals	—	3,063–3,244	.486	—	—	—	33–35	.485	—	—	—
