= List of Buffalo Bisons seasons =

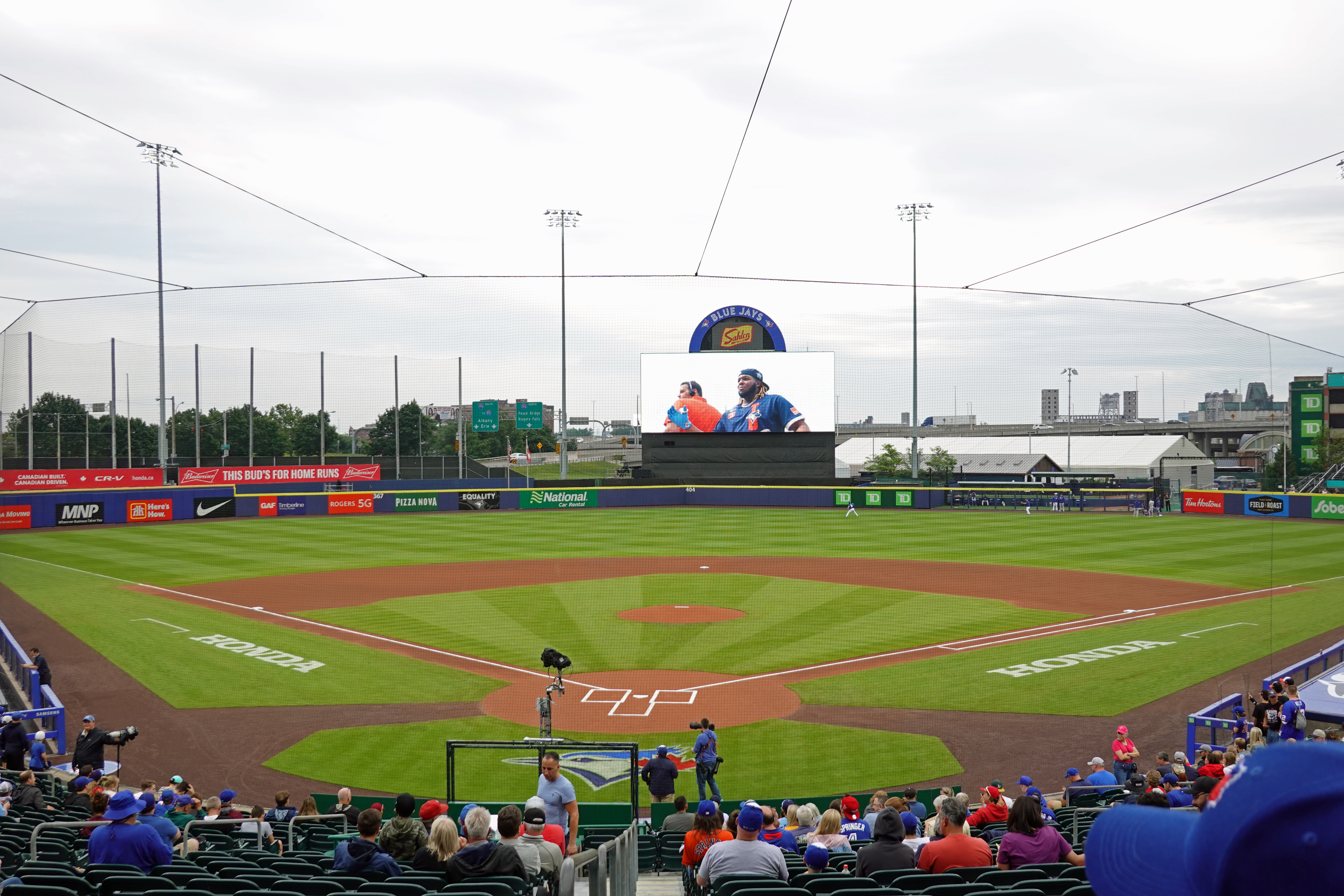
The Buffalo Bisons have played at Sahlen Field since 1988.

The Buffalo Bisons are a Minor League Baseball team based in Buffalo, New York. Established in 1979, they initially competed in the Double-A Eastern League (EL), staying in this league until 1984. The Bisons moved up to Triple-A in 1985 as members of the American Association (AA) before joining the International League (IL) in 1998. They were placed in the Triple-A East (AAAE) in 2021, but this became the International League in 2022.

Since their establishment in 1979, the Bisons have played 6,704 regular season games compiling a win–loss record of 3,431–3,273 (.512). Their best season came in 2001, when they finished 91–51 (.641), while their lowest mark was 55–89 (.382) in the 1994 season.

The franchise has won three league titles, winning the final American Association championship in 1997, in addition to winning the International League championship in 1998 and 2004. The Bisons have also claimed ten division titles, including three consecutive division championships from 1996 to 1998, and one wild card berth in 2002.

== Seasons ==
=== Table key ===
League	The team's final position in the league standings
Division	The team's final position in the divisional standings
GB	Games behind the team that finished in first place in the division that season (Note: For split-season records in the International League, this number indicates the number of games behind the team that finished in first place in the league that season.)
Apps.	Postseason appearances: number of seasons the team qualified for the postseason
‡	Class champions (1988–present)
†	League champions (1979–present)
*	Division champions (1979–2022)
^	Postseason berth (1979–present)

=== Season-by-season records ===
Season	League	Regular season					Postseason			MLB affiliate	Ref.
Season	League	Record	Win %	League	Division	GB	Record	Win %	Result	MLB affiliate	Ref.
1979	EL	72–67	.518	4th	4th	11	—		Result	Pittsburgh Pirates	
1980^	EL	67–70	.489	5th	2nd	10	0–2	.000	Won First Half North Division title Lost in Semi-Finals vs. Holyoke Millers, 2–0	Pittsburgh Pirates	
1981	EL	56–81	.409	7th	4th	28	—			Pittsburgh Pirates	
1982	EL	55–84	.396	8th	4th	27	—			Pittsburgh Pirates	
1983^	EL	74–65	.532	3rd	3rd	21 1/2	0–2	.000	Lost in Semi-Finals vs. Lynn Sailors, 2–0	Cleveland Indians	
1984	EL	72–67	.518	5th	5th	9 1/2	—			Cleveland Indians	
1985	AA	66–76	.465	7th	3rd	8	—			Chicago White Sox	
1986	AA	71–71	.500	5th	2nd	9	—			Chicago White Sox	
1987	AA	66–74	.471	5th	5th	13	—			Cleveland Indians	
1988	AA	72–70	.507	6th	3rd	17	—			Pittsburgh Pirates	
1989	AA	80–62	.563	2nd	2nd	5	—			Pittsburgh Pirates	
1990	AA	85–62	.578	3rd	2nd	1	—	—	— (Note: Buffalo finished the 1990 season tied for first place with the Nashville Sounds, each with 85–61 records. On September 4, Nashville defeated Buffalo in a one-game tiebreaker, 4–3 in 18 innings, to win the Eastern Division title.)	Pittsburgh Pirates	
1991 *	AA	81–62	.566	1st	1st	—	2–3	.400	Won East Division title Lost AA Championship vs. Denver Zephyrs, 3–2	Pittsburgh Pirates	
1992 *	AA	87–57	.604	1st	1st	—	0–4	.000	Won East Division title Lost AA Championship vs. Oklahoma City 89ers, 4–0	Pittsburgh Pirates	
1993	AA	71–73	.493	4th	2nd	10 1/2	—			Pittsburgh Pirates	
1994	AA	55–89	.382	8th	8th	31 1/2	—			Pittsburgh Pirates	
1995^	AA	82–62	.569	2nd	2nd	6	6–3	.667	Won semifinals vs. Omaha Royals, 3–1; Lost AA Championship vs. Louisville Redbirds, 3–2	Cleveland Indians	
1996 *	AA	84–60	.583	1st	1st	—	2–3	.400	Won East Division title Lost semifinals vs. Indianapolis Indians, 3–2	Cleveland Indians	
1997^ * †	AA	87–57	.604	1st	1st	—	6–2	.750	Won East Division title Won semifinals vs. Indianapolis Indians, 3–2; Won AA Championship vs. Iowa Cubs, 3–0	Cleveland Indians	
1998^ * †	IL	81–62	.566	1st	1st	—	7–5	.583	Won North Division title Won semifinals vs. Syracuse SkyChiefs, 3–0; Won Governors' Cup vs. Durham Bulls, 3–2; Lost Triple-A World Series vs. New Orleans Zephyrs, 3–1	Cleveland Indians	
1999	IL	72–72	.500	9th	4th	6	—			Cleveland Indians	
2000 *	IL	86–59	.593	1st	1st	—	2–3	.400	Won North Division title Won one-game playoff vs. Scranton/Wilkes-Barre Red Barons, 7–1; Lost semifinals vs. Scranton/Wilkes-Barre Red Barons, 3–1	Cleveland Indians	
2001 *	IL	91–51	.641	1st	1st	—	2–3	.400	Won North Division title Lost semifinals vs. Scranton/Wilkes-Barre Red Barons, 3–2	Cleveland Indians	
2002^	IL	87–57	.604	2nd	2nd	4	3–3	.500	Won semifinals vs. Scranton/Wilkes-Barre Red Barons, 3–0; Lost Governors' Cup vs. Durham Bulls, 3–0	Cleveland Indians	
2003	IL	73–70	.510	7th (tie)	T-3rd	9 1/2	—			Cleveland Indians	
2004^ * †	IL	83–61	.576	1st	1st	—	6–3	.667	Won North Division title Won semifinals vs. Durham Bulls, 3–2; Won Governors' Cup vs. Richmond Braves, 3–1	Cleveland Indians	
2005 *	IL	82–62	.569	2nd	1st	—	2–3	.400	Won North Division title Lost semifinals vs. Indianapolis Indians, 3–2	Cleveland Indians	
2006	IL	73–68	.518	7th	3rd	10 1/2	—			Cleveland Indians	
2007	IL	75–67	.528	6th	3rd	8 1/2	—			Cleveland Indians	
2008	IL	66–77	.462	10th	5th	21 1/2	—			Cleveland Indians	
2009	IL	56–87	.392	14th	7th	26	—			New York Mets	
2010	IL	76–68	.528	6th	3rd	11 1/2	—			New York Mets	
2011	IL	61–82	.427	12th	5th	20 1/2	—			New York Mets	
2012	IL	67–76	.469	9th	6th	16 1/2	—			New York Mets	
2013	IL	74–70	.514	6th	3rd	6 1/2	—			Toronto Blue Jays	
2014	IL	77–66	.538	5th	3rd	4	—			Toronto Blue Jays	
2015	IL	68–76	.472	T-6th	3rd	13	—			Toronto Blue Jays	
2016	IL	66–78	.458	9th	5th	25 1/2	—			Toronto Blue Jays	
2017	IL	65–76	.461	11th	5th	21	—			Toronto Blue Jays	
2018	IL	61–77	.442	14th	6th	22	—			Toronto Blue Jays	
2019	IL	71–69	.507	7th	3rd	4 1/2	—			Toronto Blue Jays	
2020	IL	Season cancelled (COVID-19 pandemic)								Toronto Blue Jays	
2021	AAAE	79–47 (Note: In 2021, the team with the best record at the end of the regular-season was declared the Triple-A East champion. Buffalo had a 71–46 (.607) record, 4 1/2 games behind first place, which put them 2nd in the league and 1st in their division. The regular-season was followed by the Triple-A Final Stretch, a 10-game postseason tournament in which all 30 Triple-A clubs competed for the highest winning percentage. Buffalo finished the tournament in 2nd place with a 8–1 (.889) record.)	.627	2nd	1st	—	—			Toronto Blue Jays	
2022	IL	76–72	.514	7th (tie)	4th (tie)	9	—			Toronto Blue Jays	
2023	IL	76–72	.514	8th	5th	13 1/2	—			Toronto Blue Jays	
2024	IL	68–80	.459	18th	10th	20 1/2	—			Toronto Blue Jays	
2025	IL	61–85	.418	19th	9th	26	—			Toronto Blue Jays	
2026	IL	68–79	.463	14th	7th	21 1/2	—			Toronto Blue Jays	
Totals	—	3,431–3,273	.512	—	—	—	37–40	.481	—	—	—

Note: The statistics are current as of the 2026 International League season.

=== Split-season records ===
The Eastern League, in which the Bisons competed from 1979 to 1984, used a split-season format until 1982 wherein the division winners from each half qualified for the postseason championship playoffs. The International League, in which the Bisons have been competing in since 1998, have used a split-season format since 2023 in which the teams with the best league-wide records at the end of each half qualified for the playoffs.

Split-season records
Season	League	Half	Regular-season					Postseason			MLB affiliate	Ref.
Season	League	Half	Record	Win %	League	Division	GB	Record	Win %	Result	MLB affiliate	Ref.
1979	EL	1st	36–33	.522	4th	—	5 1/2	—	—	—	Pittsburgh Pirates	
1979	EL	2nd	36–34	.514	4th	—	5 1/2	—	—	—	Pittsburgh Pirates	
1980^	EL	1st	39–29	.574	4th	1st	—	0–2	.000	Won First Half North Division title Lost in Semi-Finals vs. Holyoke Millers, 2–0	Pittsburgh Pirates	
1980^	EL	2nd	28–41	.406	6th	3rd	14 1/2	0–2	.000	Won First Half North Division title Lost in Semi-Finals vs. Holyoke Millers, 2–0	Pittsburgh Pirates	
1981	EL	1st	23–46	.333	8th	4th	18 1/2	—	—	—	Pittsburgh Pirates	
1981	EL	2nd	33–35	.485	4th	2nd	9 1/2	—	—	—	Pittsburgh Pirates	
1982	EL	1st	25–43	.368	8th	4th	12 1/2	—	—	—	Pittsburgh Pirates	
1982	EL	2nd	30–41	.423	6th	4th	18	—	—	—	Pittsburgh Pirates	
2023	IL	1st	34–41	.453	14th	8th	14 1/2	—	—	—	Toronto Blue Jays	
2023	IL	2nd	42–31	.575	4th	3rd	5	—	—	—	Toronto Blue Jays	
2024	IL	1st	37–37	.500	9th	4th	12 1/2	—	—	—	Toronto Blue Jays	
2024	IL	2nd	31–43	.419	19th	10th	17	—	—	—	Toronto Blue Jays	
2025	IL	1st	30–43	.411	17th (tie)	8th (tie)	16	—	—	—	Toronto Blue Jays	
2025	IL	2nd	31–42	.425	16th	9th	17	—	—	—	Toronto Blue Jays	
2026	IL	1st	35–40	.467	13th (tie)	7th (tie)	12	—	—	—	Toronto Blue Jays	
2026	IL	2nd	33–39	.458	14th	7th	10 1/2	—	—	—	Toronto Blue Jays	

== Franchise totals ==
Franchise totals by classification
Classification	Regular season		Postseason			Composite	
Classification	Record	Win %	Apps.	Record	Win %	Record	Win %
Double-A (1979–1984)	396–434	.477	2	0–4	.000	396–438	.475
Triple-A (1985–2026)	3,035–2,839	.517	11	37–36	.507	3,072–2,875	.517
All-time	3,431–3,273	.512	13	37–40	.481	3,468–3,313	.511

Franchise totals by league
League	Regular season		Postseason			Composite	
League	Record	Win %	Apps.	Record	Win %	Record	Win %
Eastern League (1979–1984)	396–434	.477	2	0–4	.000	396–438	.475
American Association (1985–1997)	987–875	.530	5	16–17	.470	1,001–892	.529
Triple-A East / International League (1998–present)	2,039–1,966	.509	6	21–19	.525	2,060–1,985	.509
All-time	3,431–3,273	.512	13	37–40	.481	3,468–3,313	.511

Franchise totals by affiliation
Affiliation	Regular season		Postseason			Composite	
Affiliation	Record	Win %	Apps.	Record	Win %	Record	Win %
Pittsburgh Pirates (1979–1982)	250–302	.453	1	0–2	.000	250–304	.451
Cleveland Indians (1983–1984)	146–132	.525	1	0–2	.000	146–134	.521
Chicago White Sox (1985–1986)	137–147	.482	—	—	—	137–147	.482
Cleveland Indians (1987)	66–74	.471	—	—	—	66–74	.471
Pittsburgh Pirates (1988–1994)	531–475	.527	2	2–7	.222	533–482	.525
Cleveland Indians (1995–2008)	1,123–882	.560	9	35–29	.547	1,158–911	.560
New York Mets (2009–2012)	260–313	.454	—	—	—	260–313	.454
Toronto Blue Jays (2013–present)	910–945	.491	—	—	—	910–945	.491
All-time	3,431–3,273	.512	13	37–40	.481	3,468–3,313	.511
