= List of Nashville Vols presidents =

The Nashville Vols minor league baseball team had a group of owners with a president during its time in Nashville, Tennessee. Originally known as the Nashville Baseball Club, the team did not receive their official moniker, the Nashville Volunteers, until 1908. However, the team was, and is, commonly referred to as the Vols. The team's first owner was Newt Fisher.

In 1905, Bradley Walker and four other investors formed a company to raise money to field the Nashville Vols baseball team, buying the team from Fisher. With Walker as president, they attempted to sell 100 shares of stock at $100 per share to support the team, but fell short of their goal. After cutting corners to remain solvent, the stock company finally placed the team up for sale in 1907. This happened to be the same year that Grantland Rice became a columnist on the sports page of The Tennessean. A larger group of new investors appeared, led by Ferdinand E. Kuhn, and raised $50,000. Advised by Rice, they re-structured the team's on-field management to pull the team out of last place and later began major renovations to Athletic Park, using the name "Sulphur Dell" which was coined by Rice.

== Presidents ==
- Newt Fisher (1901–1904)
- Bradley Walker (1905–1906)
- H. J. McSweeney (1907)
- Ferdinand E. Kuhn (1908–1910)
- William G. Hirsig (1911–1913)
- Clyde Shropshire (1914–1918)
