= List of Memphis Redbirds seasons =

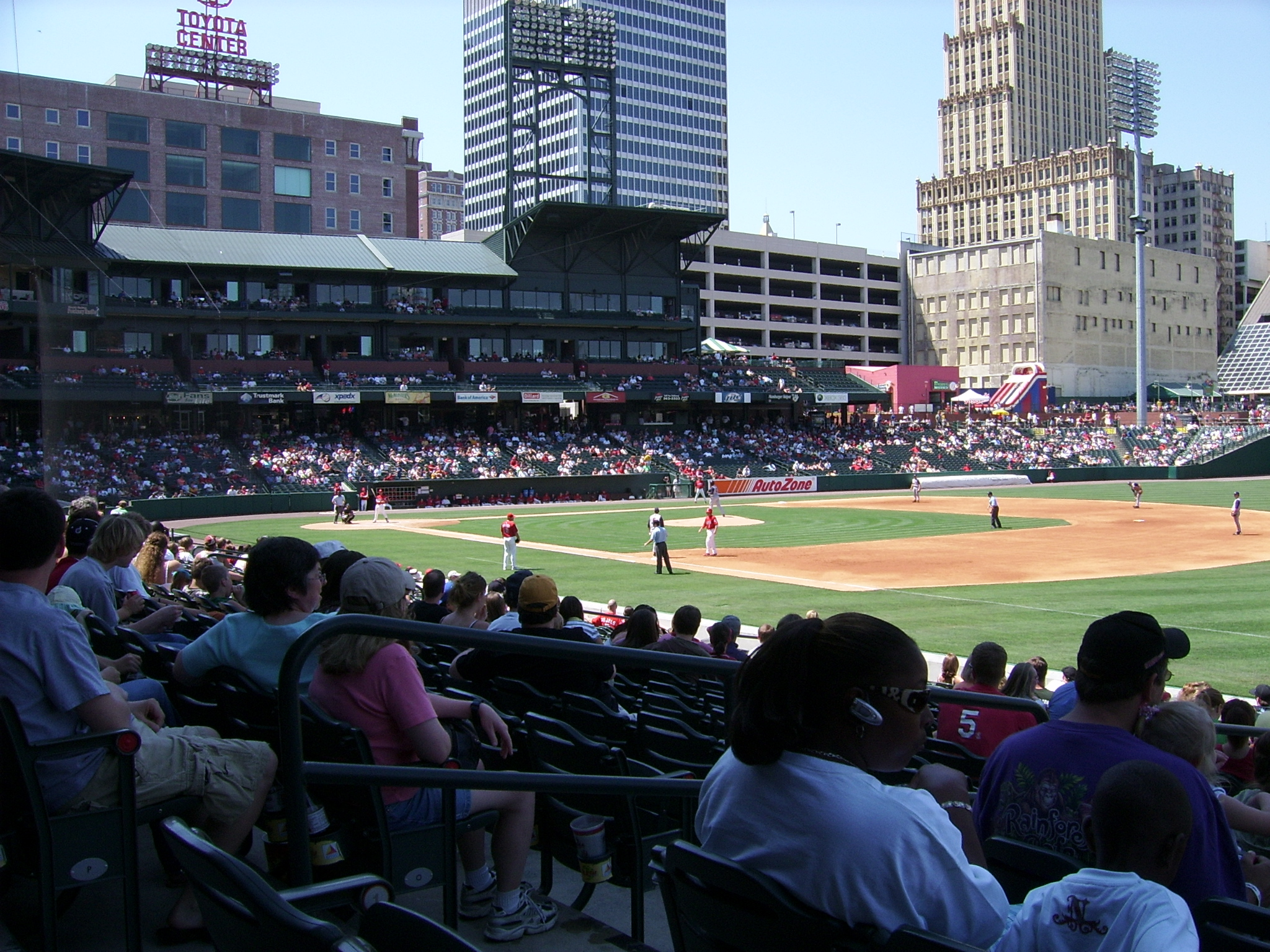
AutoZone Park, the home ballpark of the Memphis Redbirds since 2000

The Memphis Redbirds Minor League Baseball team has played in Memphis, Tennessee, for 29 years since being established in 1998. As of the completion of the 2026 season, the club has played in 4,013 regular-season games and compiled a win–loss record of 2,025–1,988 (.505). They have appeared in the postseason on seven occasions in which they have a record of 31–22 (.585) in 53 games. Combining all 4,066 regular-season and postseason games, Memphis has an all-time record of 2,056–2,010 (.506).

Created as an expansion team of the Triple-A Pacific Coast League (PCL) in 1998, the Redbirds played in this league through 2020. They were placed in the Triple-A East (AAAE) in 2021, but this became the International League (IL) in 2022. Memphis has been affiliated with Major League Baseball's St. Louis Cardinals since their inaugural season.

The Redbirds reached the postseason in 6 of their 23 years in the Pacific Coast League, all by means of winning division titles. They went on to win five conference titles and four PCL championships during this period. Their first championship came in 2000 and their second in 2009 before winning back-to-back titles in 2017 and 2018. The Redbirds participated in one Triple-A World Series, losing in 2000, and three Triple-A National Championship Games, losing in 2009 and 2017 but winning in 2018. Memphis has made one appearance in the International League playoffs by clinching a first-half title but has not won the IL championship.

The team's best season record occurred in 2017, when they finished 91–50 (.645). Their lowest season record was 56–88 (.389) in 2007.

== History ==
=== Pacific Coast League (1998–2020) ===
The Memphis Redbirds were created as an expansion team of the Triple-A Pacific Coast League (PCL) in 1998. As the Triple-A affiliate of the St. Louis Cardinals, Memphis incurred second and third-place finishes in their first two years of competition. The Redbirds made their first of six PCL playoff appearances in 2000 by winning the American Conference Southern Division title. They defeated the Albuquerque Isotopes to win the American Conference title before winning their first PCL championship against the Salt Lake Buzz. The Redbirds went on to face the Indianapolis Indians, league champions of the Triple-A International League, in the best-of-five Triple-A World Series to determine an overall champion of the classification. Memphis lost, three games to one. Over the next eight seasons, the club typically placed third or fourth (last) in their division, including a franchise-low 56–88 (.389) in 2007.

Memphis returned to the PCL playoffs in 2009 with an American Conference Northern Division title win. After sweeping Albuquerque for the conference title, they did the same against the Sacramento River Cats in the finals to win their second PCL championship. The Redbirds faced the International League's Durham Bulls in the Bricktown Showdown for the Triple-A championship, but they were defeated in the single game, 5–4.

The 2010 team posted a league-best 82–62 (.569) record, tied for first-place with the Iowa Cubs. Memphis won the division title by means of a tiebreaker (having a better regular-season record against divisional opponents than Iowa). The Redbirds swept their way back to the PCL finals with a series victory over the Oklahoma City RedHawks, but they were denied consecutive PCL crowns by the Tacoma Rainiers. Despite close second-place finishes in 2011 (2 1/2 games out of first) and 2013 (1 game back), Memphis made one playoff appearance over the next six years. They won the 2014 American Conference Southern Division title but were eliminated by the Omaha Storm Chasers in the conference series.

With a league-leading 91–50 (.645) campaign, also a franchise high, the 2017 Redbirds clinched the division title by 22 games ahead of the second-place finisher. They defeated the Colorado Springs Sky Sox in the conference series and won their third PCL championship against the El Paso Chihuahuas. In a rematch from 2009, Memphis bested Durham, 5–3, in the Triple-A National Championship Game. The Redbirds posted another league-best 83–57 (.593) season in 2018 on the way to the division title. They proceeded to advance past the Oklahoma City Dodgers before defeating the Fresno Grizzlies for a fourth PCL championship. Meeting Durham in a third Triple-A class championship, Memphis was defeated, 14–4.

With the 2020 season being cancelled due to the COVID-19 pandemic before it began and Major League Baseball's restructuring of Minor League Baseball after the season, the 2019 campaign became Memphis' last as members of the Pacific Coast League. All told, the Redbirds won six division titles, five conference titles, four league championships, and one Triple-A championship in 23 years of membership in the PCL.

=== International League (2021–present) ===
In conjunction with the 2021 restructuring of the minor leagues, the Redbirds were placed in the new Triple-A East (AAAE), but remained affiliated with the St. Louis Cardinals. Instead of holding traditional playoffs to determine a league champion, the team with the best record at the end of the regular-season was declared the winner, but 10 games were added onto the schedule as a postseason tournament, called the Triple-A Final Stretch, in which all 30 Triple-A clubs competed for the highest winning percentage. Memphis finished the tournament tied for 13th place with a 4–4 (.500) record. In 2022, the Triple-A East became known as the International League.

Since 2023, seasons have been played with a split-season format in which the teams with the best league-wide records at the end of each half qualify for the playoffs. The Redbirds qualified for their first International League postseason by winning the 2026 first-half title with a league-best 47–28 (.627) record. They were defeated by the second-half champion Rochester Red Wings, 2–1, in the best-of-three series for the IL championship.

== Season-by-season records ==
Key
League	The team's final position in the league standings
Division	The team's final position in the divisional standings
GB	Games behind the team that finished in first place in the division that season
Apps.	Postseason appearances: number of seasons the team qualified for the postseason
‡	Class champions (1998–present)
†	League champions (1998–present)
§	Conference champions (1998–2020)
*	Division champions (1998–2022)
^	Postseason berth (2023–present)

Season-by-season records
Season	League	Regular-season					Postseason			MLB affiliate	Ref.
Season	League	Record	Win %	League	Division	GB	Record	Win %	Result	MLB affiliate	Ref.
1998	PCL	74–70	.514	9th	2nd	3	—	—	Result	—	St. Louis Cardinals
1999	PCL	74–64	.536	5th	3rd	7	—	—	—	St. Louis Cardinals	
2000 * § †	PCL	83–61	.576	3rd	1st	—	7–6	.538	Won American Conference Eastern Division title Won American Conference title vs. Albuquerque Isotopes, 3–2; Won PCL championship vs. Salt Lake Buzz, 3–1; Lost Triple-A World Series vs. Indianapolis Indians, 3–1	St. Louis Cardinals	
2001	PCL	62–81	.434	15th	4th	22	—	—	—	St. Louis Cardinals	
2002	PCL	71–71	.500	10th	4th	3	—	—	—	St. Louis Cardinals	
2003	PCL	64–79	.448	15th	4th	17	—	—	—	St. Louis Cardinals	
2004	PCL	73–71	.507	8th	2nd	8	—	—	—	St. Louis Cardinals	
2005	PCL	71–72	.497	9th	3rd	3 1/2	—	—	—	St. Louis Cardinals	
2006	PCL	58–86	.403	15th	3rd	18	—	—	—	St. Louis Cardinals	
2007	PCL	56–88	.389	16th	4th	33	—	—	—	St. Louis Cardinals	
2008	PCL	75–67	.528	5th (tie)	2nd	8	—	—	—	St. Louis Cardinals	
2009 * § †	PCL	77–67	.535	4th	1st	—	6–1	.857	Won American Conference Northern Division title Won American Conference title vs. Albuquerque Isotopes, 3–0; Won PCL championship vs. Sacramento River Cats, 3–0; Lost Triple-A championship vs. Durham Bulls	St. Louis Cardinals	
2010 * §	PCL	82–62	.569	1st (tie)	1st (tie)	—	3–3	.500	Won American Conference Northern Division title (Note: The Redbirds finished the season tied for first-place with the Iowa Cubs. The division title was decided by means of a tiebreaker (having a better regular season record against opponents in their division).); Won American Conference title vs. Oklahoma City RedHawks, 3–0; Lost PCL championship vs. Tacoma Rainiers, 3–0	St. Louis Cardinals	
2011	PCL	77–66	.538	4th	2nd	2 1/2	—	—	—	St. Louis Cardinals	
2012	PCL	57–87	.396	14th	3rd	26	—	—	—	St. Louis Cardinals	
2013	PCL	69–75	.479	11th	2nd	1	—	—	—	St. Louis Cardinals	
2014 *	PCL	79–64	.552	3rd	1st	—	1–3	.250	Won American Conference Southern Division title Lost American Conference title vs. Omaha Storm Chasers, 3–1	St. Louis Cardinals	
2015	PCL	73–71	.507	8th	2nd	5	—	—	—	St. Louis Cardinals	
2016	PCL	65–77	.458	14th	4th	18	—	—	—	St. Louis Cardinals	
2017 * § †	PCL	91–50	.645	1st	1st	—	6–5	.545	Won American Conference Southern Division title Won American Conference title vs. Colorado Springs Sky Sox, 3–2; Won PCL championship vs. El Paso Chihuahuas, 3–2; Lost Triple-A championship vs. Durham Bulls	St. Louis Cardinals	
2018 * § † ‡	PCL	83–57	.593	1st	1st	—	7–2	.778	Won American Conference Southern Division title Won American Conference title vs. Oklahoma City Dodgers, 3–1; Won PCL championship vs. Fresno Grizzlies, 3–1; Won Triple-A championship vs. Durham Bulls	St. Louis Cardinals	
2019	PCL	69–71	.493	8th	2nd	6	—	—	—	St. Louis Cardinals	
2020	PCL	Season cancelled (COVID-19 pandemic) (Note: The 2020 season was cancelled due to the COVID-19 pandemic with no games played.)								St. Louis Cardinals	
2021	AAAE	61–67 (Note: In 2021, the team with the best record at the end of the regular-season was declared the Triple-A East champion. Memphis had a 57–63 (.475) record, 20 games behind first place, which put them 12th in the league and 5th in their division. The regular-season was followed by the Triple-A Final Stretch, a 10-game postseason tournament in which all 30 Triple-A clubs competed for the highest winning percentage. Memphis finished the tournament tied for 13th place with a 4–4 (.500) record.)	.477	11th (tie)	5th	24	—	—	—	St. Louis Cardinals	
2022	IL	73–77	.487	13th	6th	18 1/2	—	—	—	St. Louis Cardinals	
2023	IL	71–78	.477	11th	5th	13 1/2	—	—	—	St. Louis Cardinals	
2024	IL	74–74	.500	9th	5th	15	—	—	—	St. Louis Cardinals	
2025	IL	80–68	.541	8th	4th	6 1/2	—	—	—	St. Louis Cardinals	
2026^	IL	83–67	.553	2nd	1st	—	1–2	.333	Won first-half title Lost IL championship vs. Rochester Red Wings, 2–1	St. Louis Cardinals	
Totals	—	2,025–1,988	.505	—	—	—	31–22	.585	—	—	—

=== Split-season records ===
The International League has used a split-season schedule since 2023 wherein the team with the best league-wide record at the end of each half qualifies for the postseason championship playoffs.

Split-season records
Season	League	Half	Regular-season					Postseason			MLB affiliate	Ref.
Season	League	Half	Record	Win %	League	Division	GB	Record	Win %	Result	MLB affiliate	Ref.
2023	IL	1st	39–36	.520	8th (tie)	6th	9 1/2	—	—	Result	—	St. Louis Cardinals
2023	IL	2nd	32–42	.432	17th	9th	15 1/2	—	—		—	St. Louis Cardinals
2024	IL	1st	38–37	.507	7th (tie)	4th (tie)	12	—	—	—	St. Louis Cardinals	
2024	IL	2nd	36–37	.493	9th (tie)	8th	11 1/2	—	—	—	St. Louis Cardinals	
2025	IL	1st	41–32	.562	6th	3rd	5	—	—	—	St. Louis Cardinals	
2025	IL	2nd	39–36	.520	9th (tie)	4th (tie)	10	—	—	—	St. Louis Cardinals	
2026^	IL	1st	47–28	.627	1st	1st	—	1–2	.333	Won first-half title Lost IL championship vs. Rochester Red Wings, 2–1	St. Louis Cardinals	
2026^	IL	2nd	36–39	.480	13th	7th	9	1–2	.333	Won first-half title Lost IL championship vs. Rochester Red Wings, 2–1	St. Louis Cardinals	
Totals	—	—	308–287	.518	—	—	—	1–2	.333	—	—	—

== Franchise totals ==
=== By league ===
Franchise totals by league
League	Regular-season		Postseason			Composite	
League	Record	Win %	Apps.	Record	Win %	Record	Win %
Pacific Coast League (1998–2020)	1,583–1,557	.504	6	30–20	.600	1,613–1,577	.506
Triple-A East / International League (2021–2025)	442–431	.506	1	1–2	.333	443–433	.506
All-time	2,025–1,988	.505	7	31–22	.585	2,056–2,010	.506
