= List of Nashville Sounds seasons =

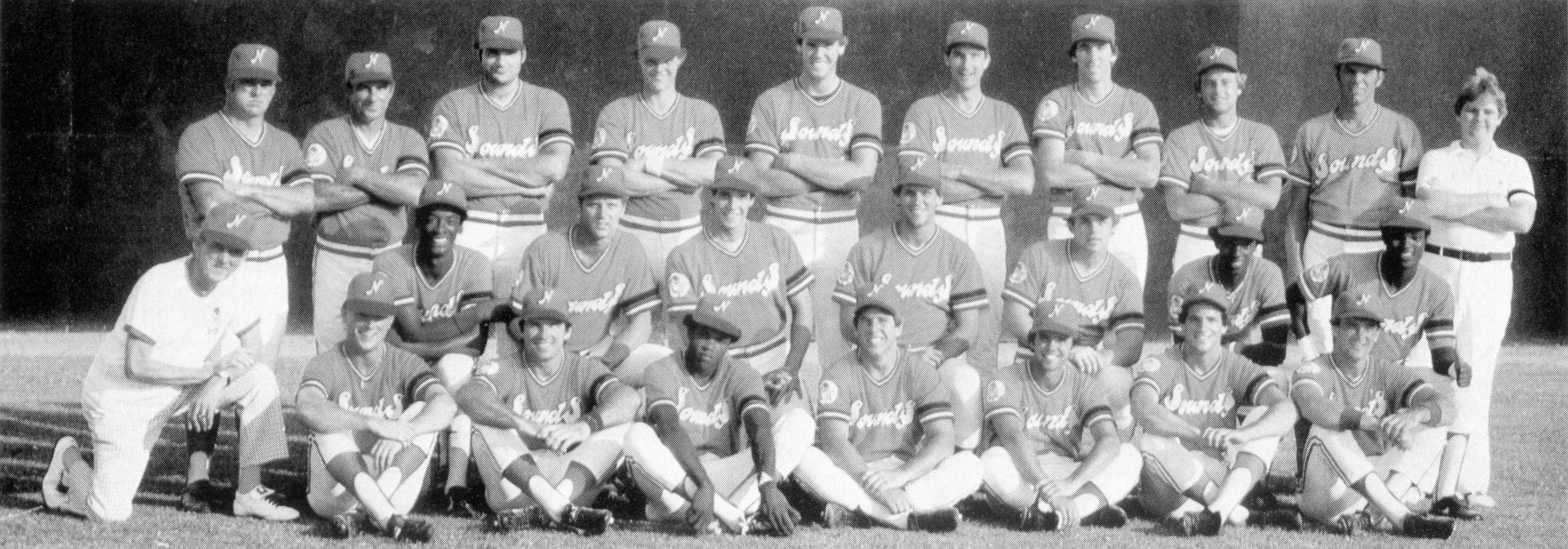
The 1980 Sounds set a team-best 97–46 (.678) record playing as the Double-A affiliate of the New York Yankees in the Southern League.

The Nashville Sounds Minor League Baseball team has played in Nashville, Tennessee, for 49 years since being established in 1978. As of the completion of the 2026 season, the club has played 6,874 regular-season games and compiled a win–loss record of 3,570–3,302–2 (.519). They have appeared in the postseason on 15 occasions in which they have a record of 42–42 (.500) in 84 games. Combining all 6,958 regular-season and postseason games, Nashville has an all-time record of 3,612–3,344–2 (.519).

Created as an expansion team of the Double-A Southern League (SL) in 1978, the Sounds played in the league through 1984. At the Double-A classification, Nashville was affiliated with Major League Baseball's Cincinnati Reds (1978–1979) and New York Yankees (1980–1984). The Sounds moved up to Triple-A in 1985 as members of the American Association (AA), joined the Pacific Coast League (PCL) in 1998, and were placed in the Triple-A East (AAAE) in 2021 before it was renamed the International League (IL) in 2022. At Triple-A, they have been affiliates of the Detroit Tigers (1985–1986), Cincinnati Reds (1987–1992), Chicago White Sox (1993–1997), Pittsburgh Pirates (1998–2004), Milwaukee Brewers (2005–2014), Oakland Athletics (2015–2018), Texas Rangers (2019–2020), and Milwaukee Brewers (2021–present).

Nashville reached the postseason in six of their seven years in the Southern League, all by means of winning the Second-Half Western Division title. They went on to win three Western Division titles and two Southern League championships during this period. Their first championship came in 1979 as the Double-A affiliate of the Reds and their second in 1982 as the Double-A affiliate of the Yankees. The Sounds' 13 years in the American Association were less successful. Though Nashville posted eight winning seasons and qualified for the playoffs three times, including twice by virtue of clinching the Eastern Division title, they failed to win an American Association championship. Over 23 years as members of the Pacific Coast League, the Sounds won five division titles, two conference titles, and one Pacific Coast League championship. Their lone PCL title came in 2005 as the Triple-A affiliate of the Brewers. Nashville has made one appearance in the International League playoffs by clinching the Western Division title but has not won an International League championship.

The team's best season record occurred in 1980 when they finished 97–46 (.678) as the Double-A Yankees. Their lowest season record was 57–87 (.396) in 2013 as the Triple-A Brewers. Of the eight Major League Baseball teams with which Nashville has been affiliated, the Sounds experienced their best record as the Double-A farm club of the Yankees from 1980 to 1984. They had a composite season record of 417–306 (.577) and reached the postseason in all five years, winning two division titles and one league championship. Including a postseason mark of 14–14 (.500), their overall record was 431–320 (.574). Conversely, the team's lowest record was as the Rangers' Triple-A club from 2019 to 2020. The Sounds incurred a 66–72 (.478) record and did not reach the postseason during the affiliation.

== History ==
=== Southern League (1978–1984) ===
The Nashville Sounds were created as an expansion team of the Double-A Southern League (SL) in 1978. The league used a split-season schedule wherein the division winners from each half qualified for the postseason championship playoffs. As the Double-A affiliate of the Cincinnati Reds, the Sounds had a losing record and did not qualify for the playoffs in their inaugural 1978 season. This was the only time in which the team finished under .500 and missed the playoffs during their seven years as members of the league. Nashville won six consecutive Second-Half Western Division titles from 1979 to 1984. The 1979 club defeated the Memphis Chicks to win the Western Division title before winning their first Southern League championship against the Columbus Astros. Through two seasons with Cincinnati, the Sounds had a 147–138 (.516) regular-season win–loss record, while they went 5–2 (.714) in the postseason, for a composite record of 152–140 (.521).

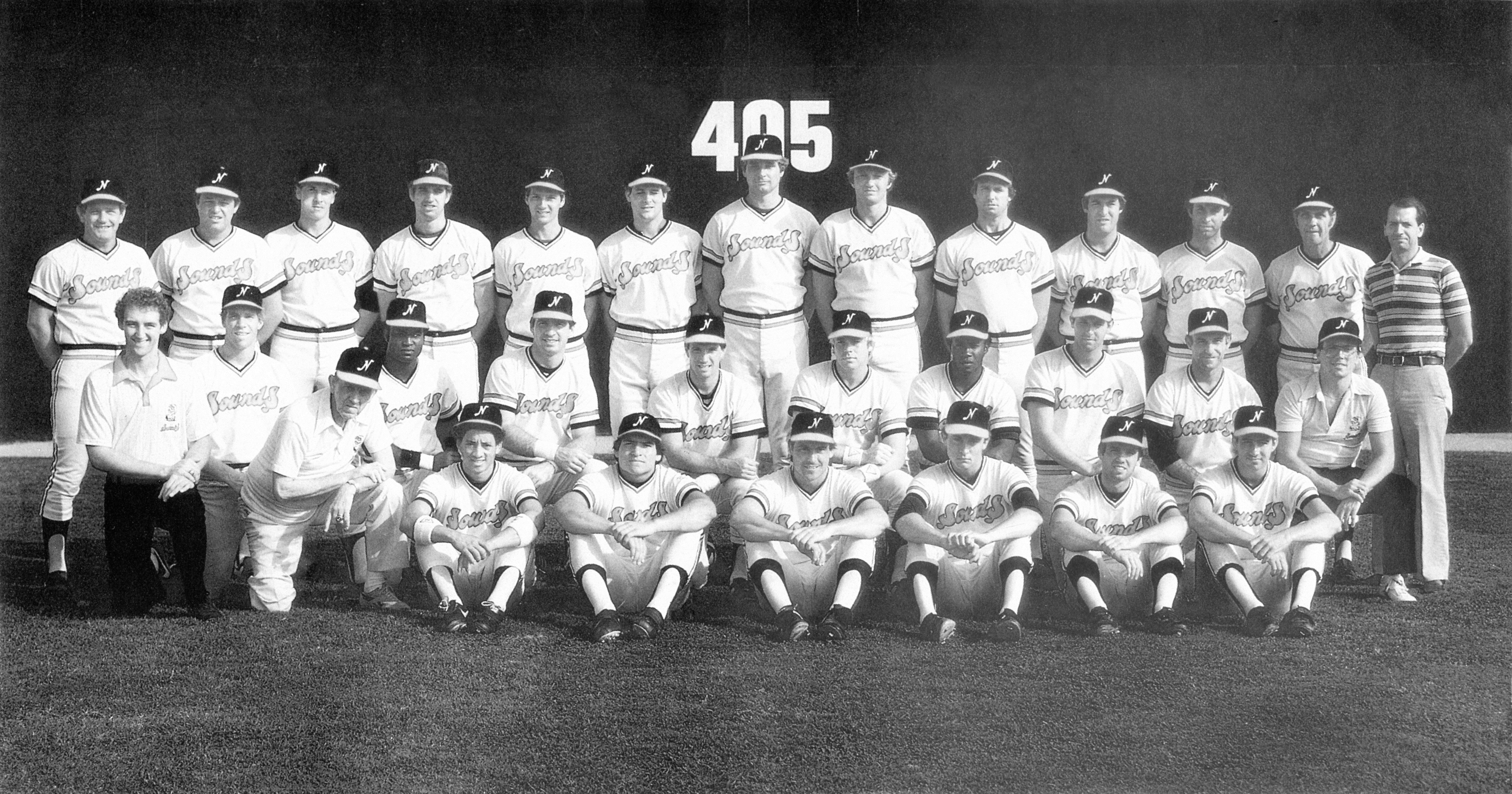
The Sounds won the 1982 Southern League championship as the Double-A affiliate of the New York Yankees.

Nashville became the Double-A affiliate of the New York Yankees in 1980 and began the partnership by setting their all-time best season record of 97–46 (.678). Despite finishing atop the league standings, they were defeated in the division series by Memphis. In 1981, the team again posted a league-best 81–62 (.566) record and swept Memphis in the division series but lost the SL title to the Orlando Twins. The 1982 Sounds won the division title over the Knoxville Blue Jays and defeated the Jacksonville Suns to capture their second SL championship. Each of the next two seasons ended with their elimination in the division series—by the Birmingham Barons in 1983 and Knoxville in 1984. Of all the Major League Baseball teams with which Nashville has been affiliated, the Sounds experienced their best record with New York from 1980 to 1984. They were 417–306 (.577) in the regular-season and 14–14 (.500) in postseason play, giving them a composite record of 431–320 (.574).

=== American Association (1985–1997) ===
The Sounds moved to the Triple-A American Association (AA) in 1985 as an affiliate of the Detroit Tigers. Nashville finished one game over .500 in 1985 and incurred a losing record in 1986, their first since 1978. Over two years with Detroit, they had a 139–144–2 (.491) record and did not qualify for the playoffs.

Nashville reaffiliated with the Cincinnati Reds at Triple-A in 1987. They qualified for the American Association playoffs for the first time in 1990 by winning the Eastern Division title, but they were defeated by the Omaha Royals in the championship round. Posting an even number of winning and losing seasons over a six-year span with the Reds, the Sounds had a 429–433 (.498) record, went 2–3 (.400) in their only playoff appearance, and had a composite record of 431–436 (.497). Combining this Triple-A affiliation and their previous Double-A partnership with Cincinnati, they had a record of 576–571 (.502), a 7–5 (.583) postseason record, and were 583–576 (.503) overall.

The Sounds became part of the Chicago White Sox organization in 1993. They reached the postseason that first year with a Western Division title win but lost the AA championship versus the Iowa Cubs. Earning a second-place playoff berth in 1994, they advanced past the New Orleans Zephyrs in the semifinals but were defeated again in the championship round by the Indianapolis Indians. During the five-year affiliation with Chicago, which included four winning campaigns, the Sounds had a season record of 383–335 (.533) and went 7–7 (.500) in postseason play, for a composite of 390–342 (.533).

=== Pacific Coast League (1998–2020) ===
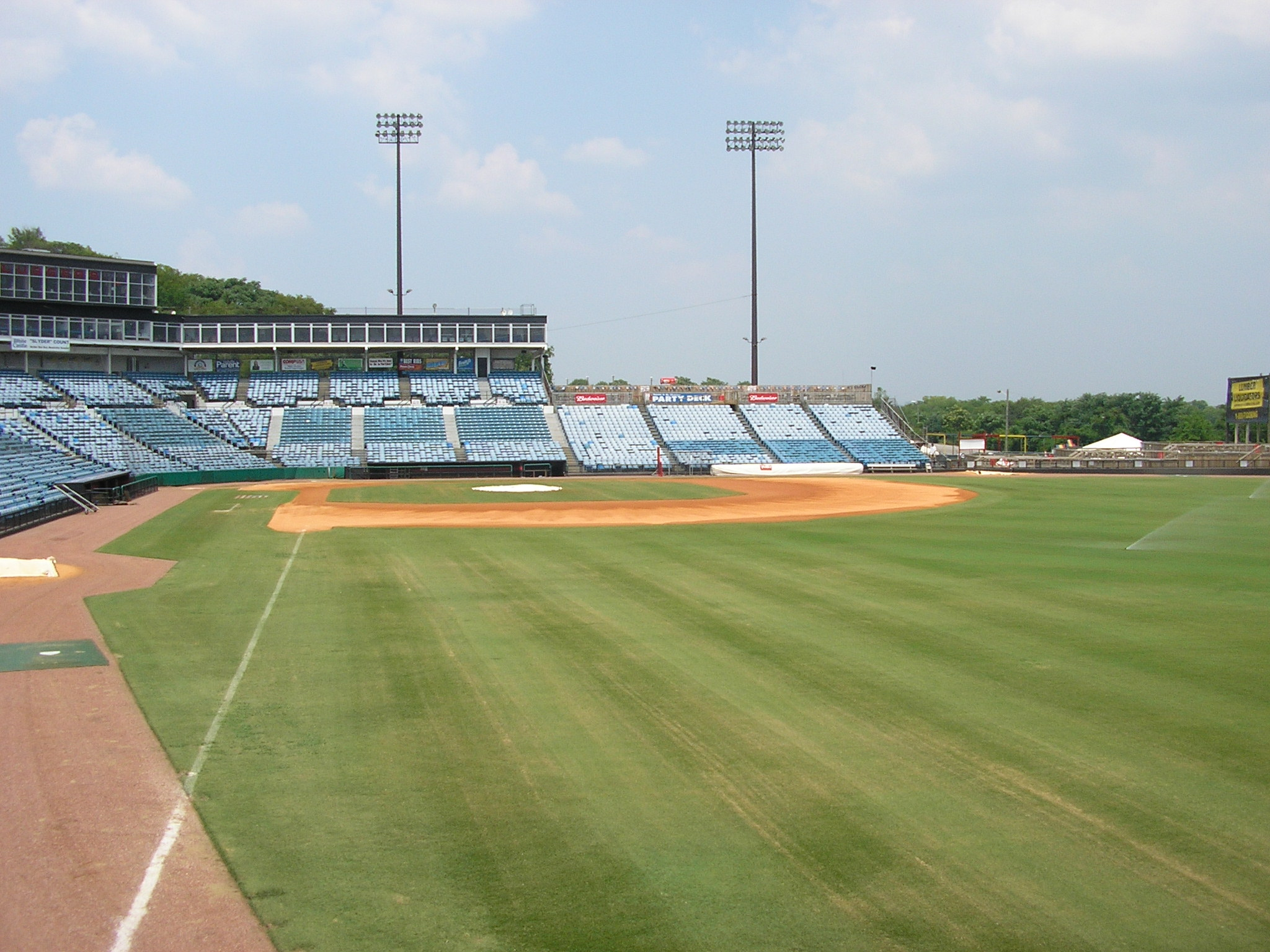
The Sounds played at Herschel Greer Stadium from 1978 to 2014.

Nashville moved to the Triple-A Pacific Coast League (PCL) in 1998 following the disbandment of the American Association after the 1997 season. As an affiliate of the Pittsburgh Pirates, the Sounds reached the postseason for the first time in eight years when they qualified for the PCL playoffs by winning the American Conference Eastern Division title in 2003. They went on to win the American Conference title over the Albuquerque Isotopes, but they lost in the finals to the Sacramento River Cats. All told, Nashville incurred losing records in four out of seven seasons with Pittsburgh in which they went 490–504 (.493), were 3–4 (.429) in their single postseason appearance, and had a composite record of 493–508 (.493).

The Sounds became an affiliate of the Milwaukee Brewers in 2005. That season, the team clinched the American Conference Northern Division title, won the conference title over the Oklahoma RedHawks, and swept the Tacoma Rainiers to win their only Pacific Coast League championship. They made a bid to repeat as PCL champions in 2006 with another division title, but they lost to the Round Rock Express in the conference series. The 2007 Sounds posted a league-leading 89–55 (.618) record, winning the division, but they were eliminated by New Orleans in the first round. The team experienced only four losing seasons in 10 years with the Brewers, including its all-time low of 57–87 (.396) in 2013. At the end of the affiliation with Milwaukee, the longest in team history, they had accumulated a 723–713 (.503) record, a 9–8 (.529) mark in postseason competition, and were 732–721 (.504) overall.

Nashville joined the Oakland Athletics organization in 2015. The 2016 Sounds ended an eight-year playoff drought by clinching the American Conference Southern Division title with a league-best 83–59 (.585) record, but their postseason run ended with a loss to the Oklahoma City Dodgers in the conference series. Over four years with Oakland, Nashville's season record was 289–276 (.512), while they went 2–3 (.400) in their only playoff appearance, for a composite record of 291–279 (.511).

The Sounds affiliated with the Texas Rangers in 2019. With the 2020 season being cancelled due to the COVID-19 pandemic before it began and Major League Baseball's restructuring of Minor League Baseball after the season, this became their only campaign as a Rangers affiliate. Nashville had a 66–72 (.478) record, their lowest among all affiliations, and did not qualify for the playoffs.

=== International League (2021–present) ===
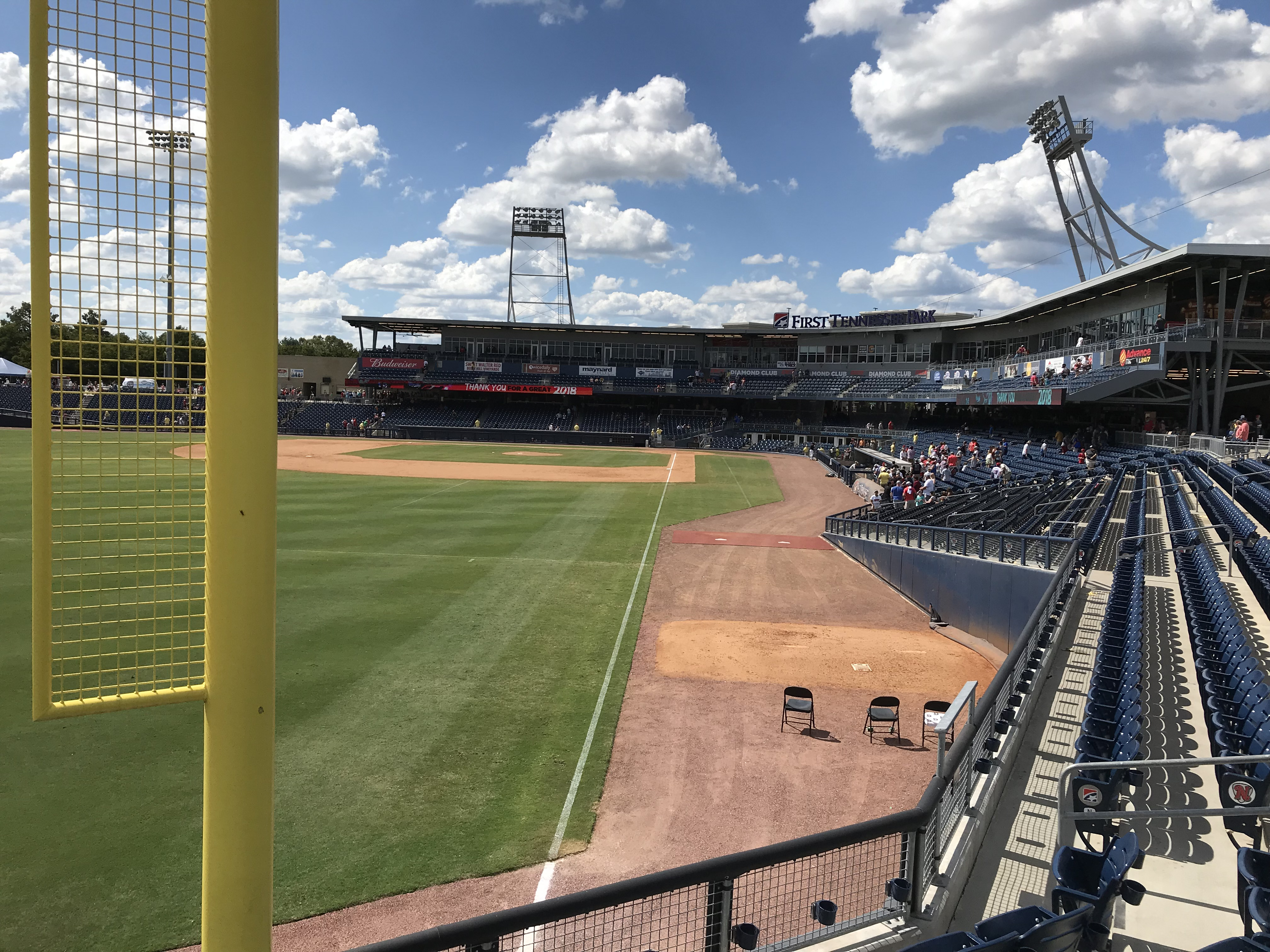
The Sounds have played at First Horizon Park since 2015.

In conjunction with the 2021 restructuring of the minor leagues, the Sounds reaffiliated with the Milwaukee Brewers and were placed in the new Triple-A East (AAAE). Instead of holding traditional playoffs to determine a league champion, the team with the best record at the end of the regular-season was declared the winner, but 10 games were added onto the schedule as a postseason tournament, called the Triple-A Final Stretch, in which all 30 Triple-A clubs competed for the highest winning percentage. Nashville finished the tournament tied for fourth place with a 7–2 (.778) record.

The Triple-A East became known as the International League (IL) in 2022. The Sounds won the 2022 Western Division title with a league-best 91–58 (.611) record, but they lost a single playoff game to determine the IL championship against the Durham Bulls. Since 2023, seasons have been played with a split-season format in which the team with the best league-wide record at the end of each half qualifies for the playoffs. Nashville has not reached the postseason under this format. Over six seasons as a Brewers affiliate, Nashville holds a 487–381 (.561) record, an 0–1 (.000) postseason mark, and a 487–382 (.560) composite record. Combining both the current and former affiliations with Milwaukee, they are 1,210–1,094 (.525) in the regular-season and 9–9 (.500) in the postseason, giving them an overall record of 1,219–1,103 (.525).

== Season-by-season records ==
Key
League	The team's final position in the league standings
Division	The team's final position in the divisional standings
GB	Games behind the team that finished in first place in the division that season (Note: For split-season records, this number indicates the number of games behind the playoff qualifier in that half of the season.)
Apps.	Postseason appearances: number of seasons the team qualified for the postseason
†	League champions (1978–present)
§	Conference champions (1998–2020)
*	Division champions (1978–2022)
^	Postseason berth (1978–present)

Season-by-season records
Season	League	Regular-season					Postseason			MLB affiliate	Ref.
Season	League	Record	Win %	League	Division	GB	Record	Win %	Result	MLB affiliate	Ref.
1978	SL	64–77	.454	9th	4th	22 1/2	—	—	Result	—	Cincinnati Reds
1979^ * †	SL	83–61	.576	2nd	1st	—	5–2	.714	Won Second-Half Western Division title Won Western Division title vs. Memphis Chicks, 2–1; Won SL championship vs. Columbus Astros, 3–1	Cincinnati Reds	
1980^	SL	97–46	.678	1st	1st	—	1–3	.250	Won Second-Half Western Division title Lost Western Division title vs. Memphis Chicks, 3–1	New York Yankees	
1981^ *	SL	81–62	.566	1st	1st	—	4–3	.571	Won Second-Half Western Division title Won Western Division title vs. Memphis Chicks, 3–0; Lost SL championship vs. Orlando Twins, 3–1	New York Yankees	
1982^ * †	SL	77–67	.535	2nd	1st	—	6–2	.750	Won Second-Half Western Division title Won Western Division title vs. Knoxville Blue Jays, 3–1; Won SL championship vs. Jacksonville Suns, 3–1	New York Yankees	
1983^	SL	88–58	.603	2nd	2nd	3 1/2	2–3	.400	Won Second-Half Western Division title Lost Western Division title vs. Birmingham Barons, 3–2	New York Yankees	
1984^	SL	74–73	.503	5th	1st	—	1–3	.250	Won Second-Half Western Division title (Note: Nashville finished the 1984 second half tied for first place with the Birmingham Barons, each with 35–40 records. On September 4, Nashville defeated Birmingham in a one-game tiebreaker, 3–2 in 10 innings, to win the second-half title.); Lost Western Division title vs. Knoxville Blue Jays, 3–1	New York Yankees	
1985	AA	71–70–1	.504	5th	2nd	2 1/2	—	—	—	Detroit Tigers	
1986	AA	68–74–1	.479	6th	3rd	12	—	—	—	Detroit Tigers	
1987	AA	64–76	.457	7th (tie)	— (Note: The American Association was not split into divisions in 1987.)	15	—	—	—	Cincinnati Reds	
1988	AA	73–69	.514	4th	2nd	16	—	—	—	Cincinnati Reds	
1989	AA	74–72	.507	3rd (tie)	3rd	13	—	—	—	Cincinnati Reds	
1990 *	AA	86–61	.585	2nd	1st	—	2–3	.400	Won Eastern Division title (Note: Nashville finished the 1990 season tied for first place with the Buffalo Bisons, each with 85–61 records. On September 4, Nashville defeated Buffalo in a one-game tiebreaker, 4–3 in 18 innings, to win the division title.); Lost AA championship vs. Omaha Royals, 3–2	Cincinnati Reds	
1991	AA	65–78	.455	6th	3rd	16	—	—	—	Cincinnati Reds	
1992	AA	67–77	.465	6th (tie)	4th	20	—	—	—	Cincinnati Reds	
1993 *	AA	81–62	.566	2nd	1st	—	3–4	.429	Won Eastern Division title Lost AA championship vs. Iowa Cubs, 4–3	Chicago White Sox	
1994^	AA	83–61	.576	2nd	— (Note: The American Association was not split into divisions in 1994.)	3 1/2	4–3	.571	Won semifinals vs. New Orleans Zephyrs, 3–0; Lost AA championship vs. Indianapolis Indians, 3–1	Chicago White Sox	
1995	AA	68–76	.472	6th	— (Note: The American Association was not split into divisions in 1995.)	20	—	—	—	Chicago White Sox	
1996	AA	77–67	.535	4th	3rd	7	—	—	—	Chicago White Sox	
1997	AA	74–69	.517	3rd (tie)	3rd	12 1/2	—	—	—	Chicago White Sox	
1998	PCL	67–76	.469	12th	4th	9 1/2	—	—	—	Pittsburgh Pirates	
1999	PCL	80–60	.571	4th	2nd	2	—	—	—	Pittsburgh Pirates	
2000	PCL	63–79	.444	13th	4th	19	—	—	—	Pittsburgh Pirates	
2001	PCL	64–77	.454	13th	3rd	19	—	—	—	Pittsburgh Pirates	
2002	PCL	72–71	.503	8th (tie)	3rd	2 1/2	—	—	—	Pittsburgh Pirates	
2003 * §	PCL	81–62	.566	2nd	1st	—	3–4	.429	Won American Conference Eastern Division title Won American Conference title vs. Albuquerque Isotopes, 3–1; Lost PCL championship vs. Sacramento River Cats, 3–0	Pittsburgh Pirates	
2004	PCL	63–79	.444	14th	4th	17	—	—	—	Pittsburgh Pirates	
2005 * § †	PCL	75–69	.521	6th	1st	—	6–2	.750	Won American Conference Northern Division title Won American Conference title vs. Oklahoma RedHawks, 3–2; Won PCL championship vs. Tacoma Rainiers, 3–0	Milwaukee Brewers	
2006 *	PCL	76–68	.528	5th (tie)	1st (tie)	—	2–3	.400	Won American Conference Northern Division title (Note: Nashville finished the 2006 season tied for first place with the Iowa Cubs, each with 76–68 records. The division title was awarded to Nashville by virtue of winning the regular-season series versus Iowa, nine games to seven.); Lost American Conference title vs. Round Rock Express, 3–2	Milwaukee Brewers	
2007 *	PCL	89–55	.618	1st	1st	—	1–3	.250	Won American Conference Northern Division title Lost American Conference title vs. New Orleans Zephyrs, 3–1	Milwaukee Brewers	
2008	PCL	59–81	.421	16th	4th	23	—	—	—	Milwaukee Brewers	
2009	PCL	75–69	.521	5th	2nd	2	—	—	—	Milwaukee Brewers	
2010	PCL	77–67	.535	5th	4th	5	—	—	—	Milwaukee Brewers	
2011	PCL	71–73	.493	6th (tie)	3rd	9	—	—	—	Milwaukee Brewers	
2012	PCL	67–77	.465	12th	2nd	16	—	—	—	Milwaukee Brewers	
2013	PCL	57–87	.396	16th	4th	13	—	—	—	Milwaukee Brewers	
2014	PCL	77–67	.535	5th	2nd	2 1/2	—	—	—	Milwaukee Brewers	
2015	PCL	66–78	.458	12th	3rd	12	—	—	—	Oakland Athletics	
2016 *	PCL	83–59	.585	1st	1st	—	2–3	.400	Won American Conference Southern Division title Lost American Conference title vs. Oklahoma City Dodgers, 3–2	Oakland Athletics	
2017	PCL	68–71	.489	8th (tie)	2nd	22	—	—	—	Oakland Athletics	
2018	PCL	72–68	.514	6th (tie)	2nd	11	—	—	—	Oakland Athletics	
2019	PCL	66–72	.478	9th	3rd	8	—	—	—	Texas Rangers	
2020	PCL	Season cancelled (COVID-19 pandemic) (Note: The start of the 2020 season was postponed due to the COVID-19 pandemic before being cancelled on June 30.)								Texas Rangers	
2021	AAAE	70–58 (Note: In 2021, the team with the best record at the end of the regular-season was declared the Triple-A East champion. Nashville had a 63–56 (.529) record, 13 1/2 games behind first place, which put them 9th in the league and 4th in their division. The regular-season was followed by the Triple-A Final Stretch, a 10-game postseason tournament in which all 30 Triple-A clubs competed for the highest winning percentage. Nashville finished the tournament tied for 4th place with a 7–2 (.778) record.)	.547	9th	4th	15	—	—	—	Milwaukee Brewers	
2022 *	IL	91–58	.611	1st	1st	—	0–1	.000	Won Western Division title Lost IL championship vs. Durham Bulls, 1–0	Milwaukee Brewers	
2023	IL	83–65	.561	4th	2nd	1	—	—	—	Milwaukee Brewers	
2024	IL	78–68	.534	4th	3rd	10	—	—	—	Milwaukee Brewers	
2025	IL	85–63	.574	5th	2nd	1 1/2	—	—	—	Milwaukee Brewers	
2026	IL	80–69	.537	6th	3rd	2 1/2	—	—	—	Milwaukee Brewers	
Totals	—	3,570–3,302–2	.519	—	—	—	42–42	.500	—	—	—

=== Split-season records ===
The Southern League, in which the Sounds competed from 1978 to 1984, used a split-season schedule wherein the division winners from each half qualified for the postseason championship playoffs. The International League has used a similar format since 2023 in which the team with the best league-wide record at the end of each half qualifies.

Split-season records
Season	League	Half	Regular-season					Postseason			MLB affiliate	Ref.
Season	League	Half	Record	Win %	League	Division	GB	Record	Win %	Result	MLB affiliate	Ref.
1978	SL	1st	28–36	.438	8th	4th	18	—	—	Result	—	Cincinnati Reds
1978	SL	2nd	36–41	.468	9th	4th	4 1/2	—	—		—	Cincinnati Reds
1979^ * †	SL	1st	35–34	.507	5th	3rd	1/2	5–2	.714	Won Second-Half Western Division title Won Western Division title vs. Memphis Chicks, 2–1; Won SL championship vs. Columbus Astros, 3–1	Cincinnati Reds	
1979^ * †	SL	2nd	48–27	.640	1st	1st	—	5–2	.714	Won Second-Half Western Division title Won Western Division title vs. Memphis Chicks, 2–1; Won SL championship vs. Columbus Astros, 3–1	Cincinnati Reds	
1980^	SL	1st	46–25	.648	2nd	2nd	1 1/2	1–3	.250	Won Second-Half Western Division title Lost Western Division title vs. Memphis Chicks, 3–1	New York Yankees	
1980^	SL	2nd	51–21	.708	1st	1st	—	1–3	.250	Won Second-Half Western Division title Lost Western Division title vs. Memphis Chicks, 3–1	New York Yankees	
1981^ *	SL	1st	38–32	.543	3rd	2nd	3 1/2	4–3	.571	Won Second-Half Western Division title Won Western Division title vs. Memphis Chicks, 3–0; Lost SL championship vs. Orlando Twins, 3–1	New York Yankees	
1981^ *	SL	2nd	43–30	.589	1st	1st	—	4–3	.571	Won Second-Half Western Division title Won Western Division title vs. Memphis Chicks, 3–0; Lost SL championship vs. Orlando Twins, 3–1	New York Yankees	
1982^ * †	SL	1st	32–38	.457	8th	4th	5 1/2	6–2	.750	Won Second-Half Western Division title Won Western Division title vs. Knoxville Blue Jays, 3–1; Won SL championship vs. Jacksonville Suns, 3–1	New York Yankees	
1982^ * †	SL	2nd	45–29	.608	1st	1st	—	6–2	.750	Won Second-Half Western Division title Won Western Division title vs. Knoxville Blue Jays, 3–1; Won SL championship vs. Jacksonville Suns, 3–1	New York Yankees	
1983^	SL	1st	40–32	.556	3rd	2nd	4 1/2	2–3	.400	Won Second-Half Western Division title Lost Western Division title vs. Birmingham Barons, 3–2	New York Yankees	
1983^	SL	2nd	48–26	.649	1st	1st	—	2–3	.400	Won Second-Half Western Division title Lost Western Division title vs. Birmingham Barons, 3–2	New York Yankees	
1984^	SL	1st	38–33	.535	2nd (tie)	2nd	3	1–3	.250	Won Second-Half Western Division title Lost Western Division title vs. Knoxville Blue Jays, 3–1	New York Yankees	
1984^	SL	2nd	36–40	.474	6th	1st	—	1–3	.250	Won Second-Half Western Division title Lost Western Division title vs. Knoxville Blue Jays, 3–1	New York Yankees	
2023	IL	1st	40–34	.541	5th	4th	8	—	—	—	Milwaukee Brewers	
2023	IL	2nd	43–31	.581	3rd	1st	4 1/2	—	—	—	Milwaukee Brewers	
2024	IL	1st	38–37	.507	7th (tie)	4th (tie)	12	—	—	—	Milwaukee Brewers	
2024	IL	2nd	40–31	.563	5th	3rd	6 1/2	—	—	—	Milwaukee Brewers	
2025	IL	1st	44–29	.603	3rd	1st	2	—	—	—	Milwaukee Brewers	
2025	IL	2nd	41–34	.547	7th	3rd	8	—	—	—	Milwaukee Brewers	
2026	IL	1st	43–32	.573	3rd	2nd	4	—	—	—	Milwaukee Brewers	
2026	IL	2nd	37–37	.500	12th	6th	7 1/2	—	—	—	Milwaukee Brewers	
Totals	—	—	890–709	.557	—	—	—	19–16	.543	—	—	—

== Franchise totals ==
=== By classification ===
Franchise totals by classification
Classification	Regular-season		Postseason			Composite	
Classification	Record	Win %	Apps.	Record	Win %	Record	Win %
Double-A (1978–1984)	564–444	.560	6	19–16	.543	583–460	.559
Triple-A (1985–2026)	3,006–2,849–2	.513	9	23–26	.469	3,029–2,841–2	.516
All-time	3,570–3,302–2	.519	15	42–42	.500	3,612–3,344–2	.519

=== By league ===
Franchise totals by league
League	Regular-season		Postseason			Composite	
League	Record	Win %	Apps.	Record	Win %	Record	Win %
Southern League (1978–1984)	564–444	.560	6	19–16	.543	583–460	.559
American Association (1985–1997)	951–912–2	.510	3	9–10	.474	960–922–2	.510
Pacific Coast League (1998–2020)	1,568–1,565	.500	5	14–15	.483	1,582–1,580	.500
Triple-A East / International League (2021–2026)	487–381	.561	1	0–1	.000	487–382	.560
All-time	3,570–3,302–2	.519	15	42–42	.500	3,612–3,344–2	.519

=== By affiliation ===
Franchise totals by affiliation
Affiliation	Regular-season		Postseason			Composite	
Affiliation	Record	Win %	Apps.	Record	Win %	Record	Win %
Cincinnati Reds (1978–1979)	147–138	.516	1	5–2	.714	152–140	.521
New York Yankees (1980–1984)	417–306	.577	5	14–14	.500	431–320	.574
Detroit Tigers (1985–1986)	139–144–2	.491	0	—	—	139–144–2	.491
Cincinnati Reds (1987–1992)	429–433	.498	1	2–3	.400	431–436	.497
Cincinnati Reds (1978–1979, 1987–1992)	576–571	.502	2	7–5	.583	583–576	.503
Chicago White Sox (1993–1997)	383–335	.533	2	7–7	.500	390–342	.533
Pittsburgh Pirates (1998–2004)	490–504	.493	1	3–4	.429	493–508	.493
Milwaukee Brewers (2005–2014)	723–713	.503	3	9–8	.529	732–721	.504
Oakland Athletics (2015–2018)	289–276	.512	1	2–3	.400	291–279	.511
Texas Rangers (2019–2020)	66–72	.478	0	—	—	66–72	.478
Milwaukee Brewers (2021–2026)	487–381	.561	1	0–1	.000	487–382	.560
Milwaukee Brewers (2005–2014, 2021–2026)	1,210–1,094	.525	4	9–9	.500	1,219–1,103	.525
All-time	3,570–3,302–2	.519	15	42–42	.500	3,612–3,344–2	.519
