= List of Omaha Storm Chasers seasons =

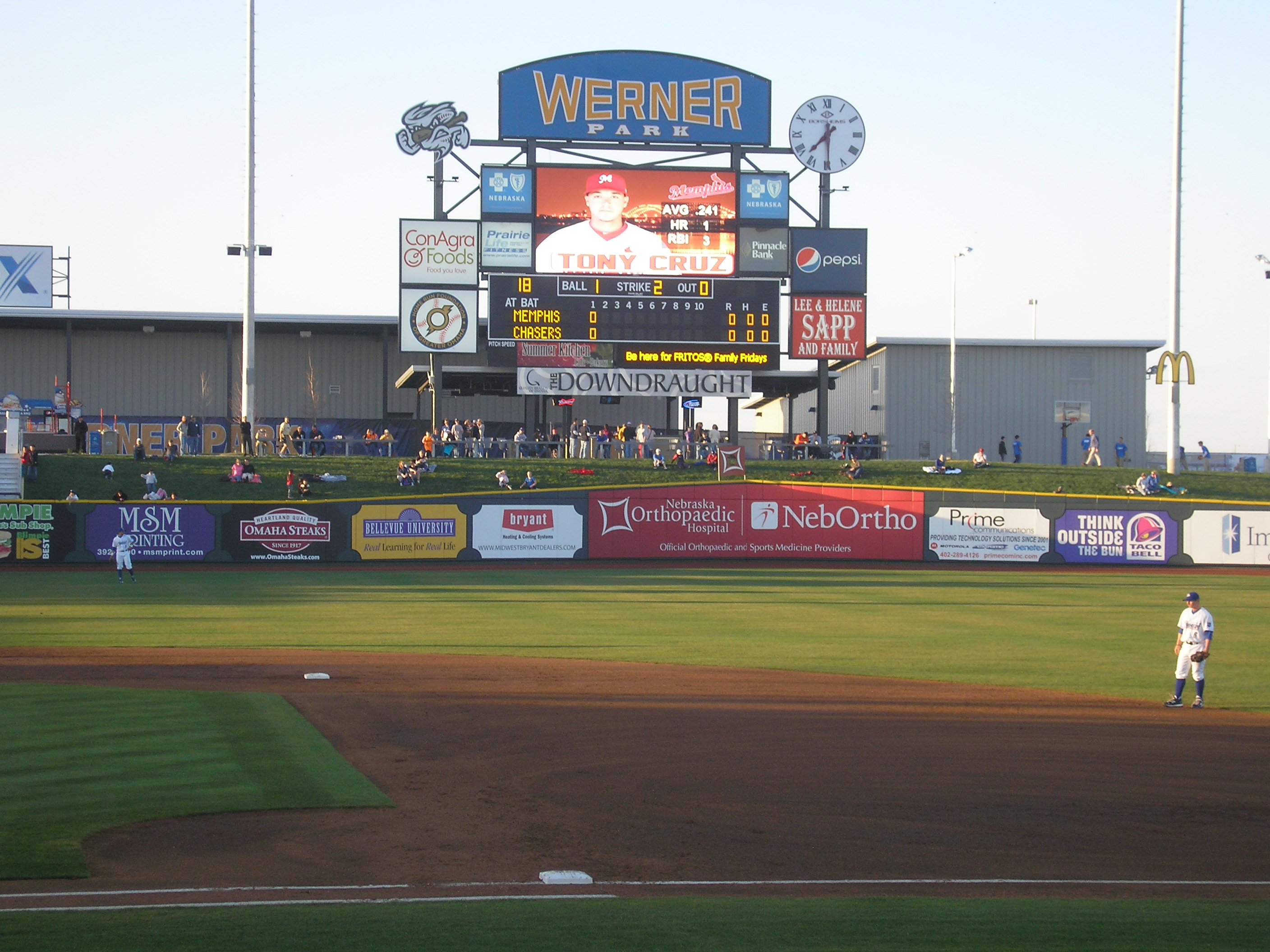
The Omaha Storm Chasers have played at Werner Park since 2011.

The Omaha Storm Chasers are a Minor League Baseball team based in Papillion, Nebraska. Established in 1969, they initially competed in the American Association (AA) before joining the Pacific Coast League (PCL) in 1998 and later transitioning to the International League (IL) in 2021.

The Storm Chasers have played 8,079 regular-season games, compiling a win–loss record of 4,043–4,036, resulting in a winning percentage of .500. Their best regular-season performance came in 1969, when they finished 85–55 (.607), while their lowest record occurred in 2006, when they went 53–91 (.368).

The team has claimed eight league titles, along with three class titles (1990, 2013, and 2014). Additionally, they have secured fifteen division titles, including a dominant four-year championship run from 2011 to 2014. The Storm Chasers also had two separate stretches of three consecutive division titles: from 1976 to 1978 and from 1988 to 1990.

The franchise endured a prolonged period of struggles between 1991 and 2009, reaching the postseason only three times and recording nine winning seasons. However, across sixteen seasons—including eleven consecutive years—under manager Mike Jirschele, the Storm Chasers made six playoff appearances and won four division titles. Jirschele guided the team to three straight Pacific Coast League championship series, winning back-to-back titles in 2012 and 2013 and finishing as the runner-up in 2011.

== Seasons ==
Key
League	The team's final position in the league standings
Division	The team's final position in the divisional standings
GB	Games behind the team that finished in first place in the division that season
‡	Class champions (1970–present)
†	League champions (1969–present)
§	Conference champions (1998–2020)
*	Division champions (1970–2022)
^	Postseason berth (1981–present)

Season-by-season records
Season	League	Regular-season					Postseason			MLB affiliate	Ref.
Season	League	Record	Win %	League	Division	GB	Record	Win %	Result	MLB affiliate	Ref.
1969 †	AA	85–55	.607	1st	—	—	—	—	Won AA championship	Kansas City Royals	
1970 * †	AA	73–65	.529	1st	1st	—	5–5	.500	Won Eastern Division title Won AA championship vs. Denver Bears, 4–1; Lost Junior World Series vs. Syracuse Chiefs, 4–1	Kansas City Royals	
1971	AA	69–70	.496	5th	3rd	15	—	—	—	Kansas City Royals	
1972	AA	71–69	.507	4th	2nd	12	—	—	—	Kansas City Royals	
1973	AA	62–73	.459	6th	4th	20 1/2	—	—	—	Kansas City Royals	
1974	AA	54–82	.397	8th	4th	24 1/2	—	—	—	Kansas City Royals	
1975	AA	67–69	.493	6th	3rd	10	—	—	—	Kansas City Royals	
1976 *	AA	78–58	.574	2nd	1st	—	2–4	.333	Won Eastern Division title Lost AA championship title vs. Denver Bears, 4–2	Kansas City Royals	
1977 *	AA	76–59	.563	1st	1st	—	2–4	.333	Won Eastern Division title Lost AA championship title vs. Denver Bears, 4–2	Kansas City Royals	
1978 * †	AA	66–69	.489	4th	1st	—	4–1	.800	Won Western Division title Won AA championship vs. Indianapolis Indians, 4–1	Kansas City Royals	
1979	AA	65–71	.478	6th	2nd	7 1/2	—	—	—	Kansas City Royals	
1980	AA	66–70	.485	4th	3rd	26	—	—	—	Kansas City Royals	
1981^ *	AA	79–57	.581	1st	1st	—	3–6	.333	Won Western Division title Won semifinals vs. Springfield Redbirds, 3–2; Lost AA championship vs. Denver Bears, 4–0	Kansas City Royals	
1982 *	AA	71–66	.518	4th	1st	—	2–4	.333	Won Western Division title Lost AA championship vs. Indianapolis Indians, 4–2	Kansas City Royals	
1983	AA	64–72	.471	6th (tie)	4th	10	—	—	—	Kansas City Royals	
1984	AA	68–86	.442	8th	—	23	—	—	—	Kansas City Royals	
1985	AA	73–69	.514	4th	3rd	6	—	—	—	Kansas City Royals	
1986	AA	72–70	.507	4th	3rd	4	—	—	—	Kansas City Royals	
1987	AA	64–76	.457	7th (tie)	—	15	—	—	—	Kansas City Royals	
1988 *	AA	81–61	.570	2nd	1st	—	1–3	.250	Won Western Division title Lost AA championship vs. Indianapolis Indians, 3–1	Kansas City Royals	
1989 *	AA	74–72	.507	3rd (tie)	1st	—	2–3	.400	Won Western Division title Lost AA championship vs. Indianapolis Indians, 3–2	Kansas City Royals	
1990 * † ‡	AA	86–60	.589	1st	1st	—	4–6	.700	Won Western Division title Won AA championship vs. Nashville Sounds, 3–2; Won Triple-A Classic vs. Rochester Red Wings, 4–1	Kansas City Royals	
1991	AA	73–71	.507	5th	3rd	6	—	—	—	Kansas City Royals	
1992	AA	67–77	.465	6th (tie)	3rd	7	—	—	—	Kansas City Royals	
1993	AA	70–74	.486	5th	3rd	15	—	—	—	Kansas City Royals	
1994	AA	68–76	.472	6th	—	18 1/2	—	—	—	Kansas City Royals	
1995^	AA	76–68	.528	3rd	—	12	1–3	.250	Lost semifinals vs. Buffalo Bisons, 3–1	Kansas City Royals	
1996 *	AA	79–65	.549	2nd	1st	—	1–3	.250	Won Western Division title Lost semifinals vs. Oklahoma City 89ers, 3–1	Kansas City Royals	
1997	AA	61–83	.424	7th	4th	13 1/2	—	—	—	Kansas City Royals	
1998	PCL	79–64	.552	4th (tie)	2nd	5 1/2	—	—	—	Kansas City Royals	
1999 *	PCL	81–60	.574	3rd	1st	—	1–3	.250	Won American Conference Midwest Division title Lost American Conference title vs. Oklahoma RedHawks, 3–1	Kansas City Royals	
2000	PCL	64–79	.448	11th	3rd	21 1/2	—	—	—	Kansas City Royals	
2001	PCL	70–74	.486	10th	3rd	13 1/2	—	—	—	Kansas City Royals	
2002	PCL	76–68	.528	4th	2nd	2	—	—	—	Kansas City Royals	
2003	PCL	70–73	.490	11th	4th	3 1/2	—	—	—	Kansas City Royals	
2004	PCL	71–73	.493	9th	3rd	8 1/2	—	—	—	Kansas City Royals	
2005	PCL	72–72	.500	8th	2nd	3	—	—	—	Kansas City Royals	
2006	PCL	53–91	.368	16th	4th	23	—	—	—	Kansas City Royals	
2007	PCL	73–71	.507	8th (tie)	3rd	16	—	—	—	Kansas City Royals	
2008	PCL	63–81	.438	14th	3rd	21	—	—	—	Kansas City Royals	
2009	PCL	64–80	.444	13th	3rd	13	—	—	—	Kansas City Royals	
2010	PCL	81–63	.563	3rd	3rd	1	—	—	—	Kansas City Royals	
2011 * § †	PCL	79–63	.556	3rd	1st	—	6–2	.750	Won American Conference Northern Division title Won American Conference title vs Round Rock Express, 3–1; Won PCL championship vs Sacramento River Cats, 3–0; Lost Triple-A championship vs Columbus Clippers	Kansas City Royals	
2012 * §	PCL	83–61	.576	2nd	1st	—	4–5	.444	Won American Conference Northern Division title Won American Conference title vs. Albuquerque Isotopes, 3–2; Lost PCL championship vs. Reno Aces, 3–1	Kansas City Royals	
2013 * § † ‡	PCL	70–74	.486	10th	1st	—	7–1	.875	Won American Conference Northern Division title Won American Conference title vs. Oklahoma City RedHawks, 3–0; Won PCL championship vs. Salt Lake Bees, 3–1; Won Triple-A championship vs. Durham Bulls	Kansas City Royals	
2014 * § † ‡	PCL	76–67	.531	6th	1st	—	7–3	.700	Won American Conference Northern Division title Won American Conference title vs. Memphis Redbirds, 3–1; Won PCL championship vs. Reno Aces, 3–2; Won Triple-A championship vs. Pawtucket Red Sox	Kansas City Royals	
2015	PCL	80–64	.556	3rd (tie)	2nd (tie)	6	—	—	—	Kansas City Royals	
2016	PCL	58–82	.414	16th	4th	22 1/2	—	—	—	Kansas City Royals	
2017	PCL	69–72	.489	8th (tie)	3rd	13	—	—	—	Kansas City Royals	
2018	PCL	66–74	.471	12th (tie)	3rd	9	—	—	—	Kansas City Royals	
2019	PCL	59–80	.424	16th	4th	15 1/2	—	—	—	Kansas City Royals	
2020	PCL	Season cancelled (COVID-19 pandemic)								Kansas City Royals	
2021	AAAE	2021 (Note: In 2021, the team with the best record at the end of the regular-season was declared the Triple-A East champion. Omaha had a 66–54 (.550) record, 11 games behind first place, which put them 8th in the league and 2nd in their division. The regular-season was followed by the Triple-A Final Stretch, a 10-game postseason tournament in which all 30 Triple-A clubs competed for the highest winning percentage. Omaha finished the tournament tied for 4th place with a 7–2 (.778) record.)	.556	7th	2nd	1/2	—	—	—	Kansas City Royals	
2022	IL	71–78	.477	14th	7th	20	—	—	—	Kansas City Royals	
2023	IL	68–77	.469	16th	9th	14 1/2	—	—	—	Kansas City Royals	
2024^ †	IL	89–59	.601	1st	1st	—	2–2	.500	Won first-half title Won IL championship vs. Columbus Clippers, 2–1; Lost Triple-A championship vs. Sugar Land Space Cowboys, 1–0	Kansas City Royals	
2025	IL	62–86	.419	17th (tie)	9th (tie)	24 1/2	—	—	—	Kansas City Royals	
2026	IL	65–81	.445	17th	8th	16	—	—	—	Kansas City Royals	
Totals	—	4,043–4,036	.500	—	—	—	54–58	.482	—	—	—
