= List of Columbus Clippers managers =

The Columbus Clippers minor league baseball franchise has employed 17 different managers since its 1977 inception in Columbus, Ohio.

== Managers ==
- Johnny Lipon (1977-1978)
- Gene Michael (1979)
- Joe Altobelli (1980)
- Frank Verdi (1981-1982)
- Johnny Oates (1983)
- Stump Merrill (1984-1985, 1990, 1993–1994, 1996–1998, 2002)
- Doug Holmquist (1985)
- Barry Foote (1986)
- Bucky Dent (1987-1989, 2003–2005)
- Rick Down (1989-1990, 1991–1992)
- Bill Evers (1995)
- Trey Hillman (1999-2001)
- Brian Butterfield (2002)
- Frank Howard (2002)
- Dave Miley (2006)
- John Stearns (2007)
- Tim Foli (2008)
- Torey Lovullo (2009)
- Mike Sarbaugh (2010-2012)
- Chris Tremie (2013-2018)
- Tony Mansolino (2019–2020)
- Andy Tracy (2021–present)
