= List of Columbus Clippers seasons =

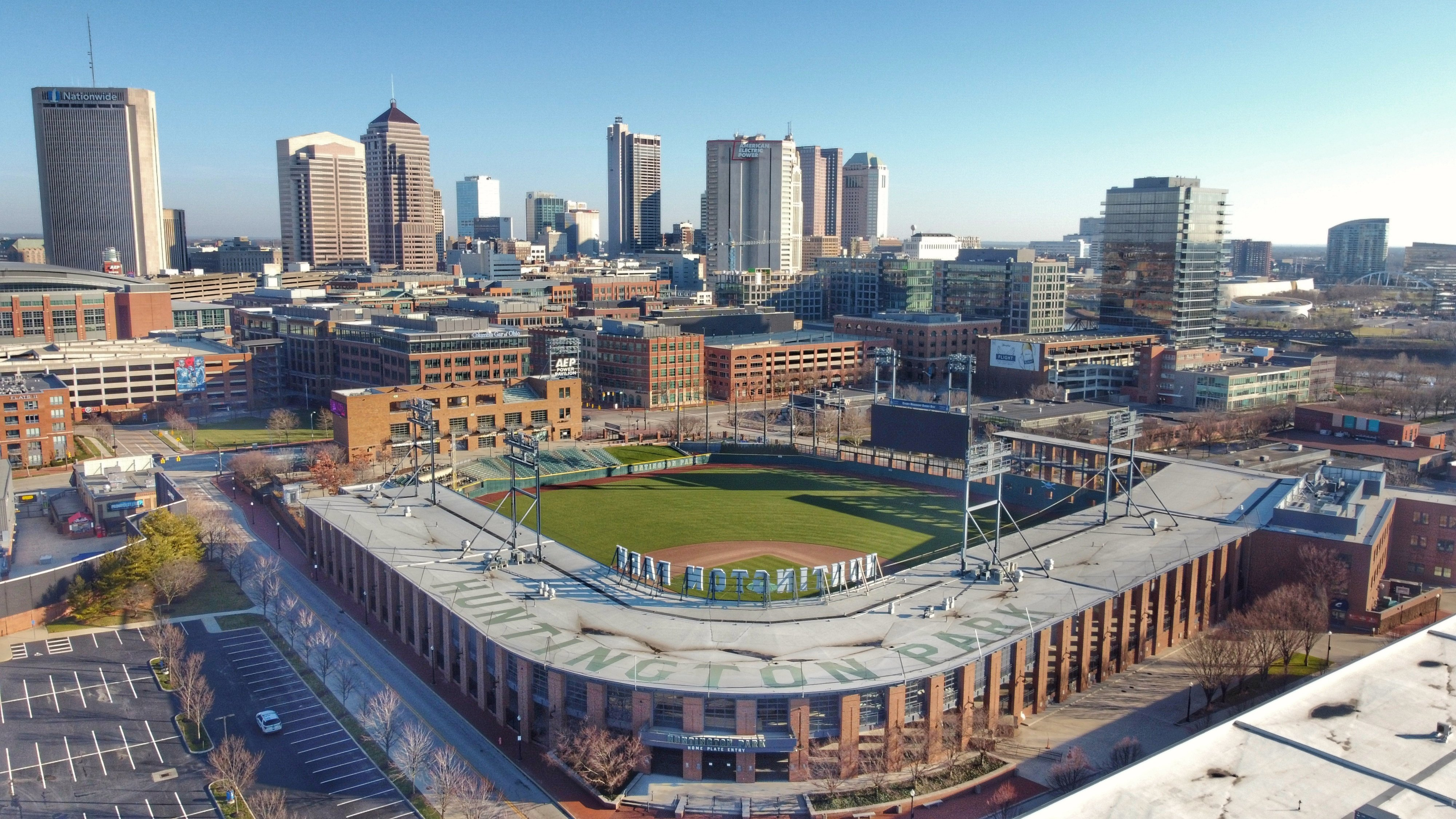
The Clippers have played at Huntington Park since 2009.

The Columbus Clippers are a Minor League Baseball team based in Columbus, Ohio. Since their establishment in 1977 as members of the International League (IL), the Clippers have played 6,967 regular-season games, compiling a win–loss record of 3,688–3,279 for a winning percentage of .529 through the end of the 2026 season. Their best season came in 1992, when they finished 95–49 (.660), while their lowest mark was 65–75 (.464) in their inaugural 1977 campaign.

With a 3,543–3,123 record through the 2024 season, the Clippers have been the most successful team in International League history. The franchise has won eleven league titles, second only to the Rochester Red Wings’ nineteen championships (including ten IL titles). In addition, the Clippers have secured two class titles (2010 and 2011), twelve division titles—including three consecutive championships from 1990 to 1992 and from 2014 to 2016—and one wild card playoff berth.

The team’s most challenging period came between 1998 and 2009, when they made just two postseason appearances and recorded only three winning seasons. However, under Stump Merrill, the franchise's most successful manager, the Clippers enjoyed an era of sustained success. Across nine non-consecutive seasons with Merrill at the helm, the team made nine postseason appearances and won three division titles. Merrill also led the Clippers to four International League championship series, winning the title in 1996 and finishing as runners-up in 1985, 1990, and 1997.

== Seasons ==
Key
League	The team's final position in the league standings
Division	The team's final position in the divisional standings
GB	Games behind the team that finished in first place in the division that season
‡	Class champions (1983–present)
†	League champions (1977–present)
*	Division champions (1988–2022)
^	Postseason berth (1977–present)

Season-by-season records
Season	League	Regular-season					Postseason			MLB affiliate	Ref.
Season	League	Record	Win %	League	Division	GB	Record	Win %	Result	MLB affiliate	Ref.
1977	IL	65–75	.464	7th	—	15	—	—	—	Pittsburgh Pirates	
1978	IL	61–78	.439	7th	—	23 1/2	—	—	—	Pittsburgh Pirates	
1979^ †	IL	85–54	.612	1st	—	—	7–4	.636	Won semifinals vs. Tidewater Tides, 3–1; Won IL championship vs. Syracuse Chiefs, 4–3	New York Yankees	
1980^ †	IL	83–57	.593	1st	—	—	7–3	.700	Won semifinals vs. Richmond Braves, 3–2; Won IL championship vs. Toledo Mud Hens, 4–1	New York Yankees	
1981^ †	IL	88–51	.633	1st	—	—	5–3	.625	Won semifinals vs. Rochester Red Wings, 3–2; Won IL championship vs. Richmond Braves, 2–1 (Note: The 1981 playoffs were cancelled due to inclement weather. Columbus was declared the winner with a 2–1 series lead against Richmond.)	New York Yankees	
1982^	IL	79–61	.564	2nd	—	3 1/2	0–3	.000	Lost semifinals vs. Tidewater Tides, 3–0	New York Yankees	
1983^	IL	83–57	.593	1st	—	—	2–3	.400	Lost semifinals vs. Tidewater Tides, 3–2	New York Yankees	
1984^	IL	82–57	.590	1st	—	—	1–3	.250	Lost semifinals vs. Pawtucket Red Sox, 3–1	New York Yankees	
1985^	IL	75–64	.540	3rd (tie)	—	3 1/2	4–4	.500	Won semifinals vs. Syracuse Chiefs, 3–1; Lost IL championship vs. Tidewater Tides, 3–1	New York Yankees	
1986	IL	62–77	.446	6th (tie)	—	17 1/2	—	—	—	New York Yankees	
1987^ †	IL	77–63	.550	2nd	—	4	6–0	1.000	Won semifinals vs. Rochester Red Wings, 3–0; Won IL championship vs. Tidewater Tides, 3–0	New York Yankees	
1988	IL	65–77	.458	5th	3rd	12 1/2	—	—	—	New York Yankees	
1989	IL	77–69	.527	3rd (tie)	2nd (tie)	4	—	—	—	New York Yankees	
1990 *	IL	87–59	.596	2nd	1st	—	2–3	.400	Won Western Division title Lost IL championship vs. Rochester Red Wings, 3–2	New York Yankees	
1991 * †	IL	85–59	.590	1st	1st	—	4–4	.500	Won Western Division title Won IL championship vs. Pawtucket Red Sox, 3–0; Lost Triple-A Classic vs. Denver Zephyrs, 4–1	New York Yankees	
1992 * †	IL	95–49	.660	1st	1st	—	6–2	.750	Won Western Division title Won semifinals vs. Richmond Braves, 3–0; Won IL championship vs. Scranton/Wilkes-Barre Red Barons, 3–2	New York Yankees	
1993	IL	78–62	.557	3rd	3rd	7 1/2	—	—	—	New York Yankees	
1994	IL	74–68	.521	4th	3rd	6 1/2	—	—	—	New York Yankees	
1995	IL	71–68	.511	4th	3rd	13 1/2	—	—	—	New York Yankees	
1996 * †	IL	85–57	.599	1st	1st	—	6–0	1.000	Won Western Division title Won semifinals vs. Norfolk Tides, 3–0; Won IL championship vs. Rochester Red Wings, 3–0	New York Yankees	
1997 *	IL	79–63	.556	3rd	1st	—	5–4	.556	Won Western Division title Won semifinals vs. Charlotte Knights, 3–1; Lost IL championship vs. Rochester Red Wings, 3–2	New York Yankees	
1998	IL	67–77	.465	12th	3rd	10	—	—	—	New York Yankees	
1999 *	IL	83–58	.589	1st	1st	—	0–3	.000	Won Western Division title Lost semifinals vs. Durham Bulls, 3–0	New York Yankees	
2000	IL	75–69	.521	8th	2nd	6	—	—	—	New York Yankees	
2001	IL	67–76	.469	9th	2nd	16 1/2	—	—	—	New York Yankees	
2002	IL	59–83	.415	12th	4th	21	—	—	—	New York Yankees	
2003	IL	76–68	.528	4th	2nd	3 1/2	—	—	—	New York Yankees	
2004 *	IL	80–64	.556	3rd	1st	—	2–3	.400	Won Western Division title Lost semifinals vs. Richmond Braves, 3–2	New York Yankees	
2005	IL	77–67	.535	5th	3rd	12	—	—	—	New York Yankees	
2006	IL	69–73	.486	9th	4th	7	—	—	—	New York Yankees	
2007	IL	64–80	.444	11th (tie)	4th	18 1/2	—	—	—	Washington Nationals	
2008	IL	69–73	.486	7th (tie)	3rd	18	—	—	—	Washington Nationals	
2009	IL	57–85	.401	13th	4th	27	—	—	—	Cleveland Indians	
2010^ † ‡	IL	75–69	.549	4th	2nd	1/2	7–2	.778	Won wild card berth Won semifinals vs. Scranton/Wilkes-Barre Yankees, 3–1; Won IL championship vs. Durham Bulls, 3–1; Won Triple-A championship vs. Tacoma Rainiers	Cleveland Indians	
2011 * † ‡	IL	85–56	.611	1st	1st	—	7–2	.778	Won Western Division title Won semifinals vs. Scranton/Wilkes-Barre Yankees, 3–1; Won IL championship vs. Durham Bulls, 3–1; Won Triple-A championship vs. Omaha Storm Chasers	Cleveland Indians	
2012	IL	75–69	.521	6th	2nd	14	—	—	—	Cleveland Indians	
2013	IL	71–73	.493	8th	2nd	9	—	—	—	Cleveland Indians	
2014 *	IL	79–65	.549	3rd	1st	—	1–3	.250	Won Western Division title Lost semifinals vs. Durham Bulls, 3–1	Cleveland Indians	
2015 * †	IL	83–61	.576	1st (tie)	1st (tie)	—	6–5	.545	Won Western Division title (Note: Columbus finished the 2015 season tied for first with the Indianapolis Indians, each with an 83–61 record. Per the International League's playoff procedures, the teams were declared co-champions of the Western Division, and the Clippers won the tiebreaker to be seeded as the division champion.); Won semifinals vs. Norfolk Tides, 3–2; Won IL championship vs. Indianapolis Indians, 3–2; Lost Triple-A championship vs. Fresno Grizzlies	Cleveland Indians	
2016 *	IL	82–62	.569	3rd	1st	—	1–3	.250	Won Western Division title Lost semifinals vs. Gwinnett Braves, 3–1	Cleveland Indians	
2017	IL	71–71	.500	6th (tie)	2nd	8	—	—	—	Cleveland Indians	
2018	IL	73–67	.521	5th (tie)	2nd (tie)	1/2	—	—	—	Cleveland Indians	
2019 * †	IL	81–59	.579	1st	1st	—	6–2	.750	Won Western Division title Won semifinals vs. Gwinnett Stripers, 3–1; Won IL championship vs. Durham Bulls, 3–0; Lost Triple-A championship vs. Sacramento River Cats	Cleveland Indians	
2020	IL	Season cancelled (COVID-19 pandemic)								Cleveland Indians	
2021	AAAE	59–68 (Note: In 2021, the team with the best record at the end of the regular-season was declared the Triple-A East champion. Columbus had a 56–62 (.475) record, 20 games behind first place, which put them 12th (tie) in the league and 5th in their division. The regular-season was followed by the Triple-A Final Stretch, a 10-game postseason tournament in which all 30 Triple-A clubs competed for the highest winning percentage. Columbus finished the tournament in 23rd place with a 3–6 (.333) record.)	.465	13th	5th	13 1/2	—	—	—	Cleveland Indians	
2022	IL	85–64	.570	4th	3rd	6	—	—	—	Cleveland Guardians	
2023	IL	68–79	.463	17th	10th	15 1/2	—	—	—	Cleveland Guardians	
2024^	IL	80–68	.541	3rd	2nd	9	1–2	.333	Won second-half title Lost IL championship vs. Omaha Storm Chasers, 2–1	Cleveland Guardians	
2025	IL	64–81	.441	13th	7th	21	—	—	—	Cleveland Guardians	
2026	IL	78–69	.531	8th (tie)	4th	3 1/2	—	—	—	Cleveland Guardians	
Totals	—	3,688–3,279	.529	—	—	—	86–61	.585	—	—	—
