= Gilhooley =

Gilhooley or Gilhooly is a surname which may refer to:

== People ==
- Brenda Gilhooly (born 1964), English comedian
- David Gilhooly (1943–2013), American ceramic artist
- Frank Gilhooley (1892–1959), American baseball player
- Frankie Gilhooley (1924–2010), American basketball player and baseball announcer
- James Gilhooly (1847–1916), Irish Nationalist politician
- Maria Gilhooley (fl. 1977–present), stage name Marry Waterson, English singer, songwriter and visual artist
- Michael Gilhooley (1894–1969), Scottish footballer
- Patrick Gilhooley (1876–1907), Scottish footballer
- Ray Gilhooley (1887–1973), American racecar driver

== Fictional characters ==
- The widow Gilhooley, in the Irish television series Killinaskully
- Thomas "Boats" Gilhooley, in the 1963 John Ford movie Donovan's Reef, played by Lee Marvin

== See also ==
- Gilhoolie, a jar opener
