= Omaha Storm Chasers =

Minor League Baseball team in Papillion, Nebraska

- Founded in 1969 in Omaha, Nebraska; Based in Papillion, Nebraska since 2011

Minor league affiliations
- Class: Triple-A (1969–present)
- League: International League (2021–present)
- Division: West Division
- Previous leagues: Pacific Coast League (1998–2020); American Association (1969–1997)

Major league affiliations
- Team: Kansas City Royals (1969–present)

Minor league titles
- Class titles (3): 1990; 2013; 2014
- League titles (8): 1969; 1970; 1978; 1990; 2011; 2013; 2014; 2024
- Conference titles (4): 2011; 2012; 2013; 2014
- Division titles (15): 1970; 1976; 1977; 1978; 1981; 1982; 1988; 1989; 1990; 1996; 1999; 2011; 2012; 2013; 2014
- First-half titles (1): 2024

Team data
- Name: Omaha Storm Chasers (2011–present)
- Previous names: Omaha Royals (2002–2010); Omaha Golden Spikes (1999–2001); Omaha Royals (1969–1998)
- Colors: Royal blue, twister gold, blackout black
- Mascots: Stormy, Casey the Lion, Vortex, Sue Nami, and Sizzle
- Ballpark: Werner Park (2011–present)
- Previous parks: Johnny Rosenblatt Stadium (1969–2010)
- Owner/ Operator: Diamond Baseball Holdings
- President: Martie Cordaro
- General manager: Laurie Schlender
- Manager: Patrick Osborn
- Website: milb.com/omaha

The Omaha Storm Chasers are a Minor League Baseball team of the International League and the Triple-A affiliate of the Kansas City Royals. They are located in Papillion, Nebraska, a suburb southwest of Omaha, and play their home games at Werner Park, which opened in 2011. The team previously played at Johnny Rosenblatt Stadium from 1969 to 2010.

Omaha has been the only Triple-A affiliate of the Kansas City Royals since their inception in the 1969 Major League Baseball expansion. They were originally known as the Omaha Royals when established as a member of the Triple-A American Association in 1969. They joined the Pacific Coast League (PCL) in 1998 and were briefly known as the Omaha Golden Spikes (1999–2001) before reverting to their Royals moniker. Omaha became the Storm Chasers in 2011. In conjunction with Major League Baseball's restructuring of Minor League Baseball in 2021, the team was placed in the Triple-A East, which rebranded as the International League in 2022.

Omaha has won eight league championships. Most recently, they won the International League championship in 2024. They previously won the PCL championship in 2011 and back-to-back in 2013 and 2014. They also won the American Association championship in 1969, 1970, 1978, and 1990. Omaha went on to win the Triple-A Classic in 1990 and the Triple-A National Championship Game in 2013 and 2014.

== History ==
=== Prior professional baseball in Omaha ===
Omaha has been home to Minor League Baseball teams since the late 19th century. The city's professional baseball history dates back to 1879 with the formation of the Omaha Green Stockings, who were charter members of the Northwestern League. They were followed by other teams, such as the Omahogs, Lambs, Indians, Rangers, Rourkes, Buffaloes, Crickets, and Packers, that competed in either the Western League or Western Association through 1936. The Omaha Cardinals were the city's team from 1947 to 1959 as members of the Class A Western League before joining the Triple-A American Association in 1955. After having no team in 1960, the Omaha Dodgers represented the city in the American Association from 1961 to 1962. The league disbanded after the 1962 season, leaving Omaha without professional baseball for the next six years.

=== American Association (1969–1997) ===
The Omaha Royals were established in 1969 as members of the American Association (AA) to serve as the Triple-A affiliate of the Kansas City Royals, who were a product of the 1969 Major League Baseball expansion. Omaha's team was named for and owned by their Major League Baseball (MLB) affiliate. Their home ballpark was Johnny Rosenblatt Stadium, which was built in 1948.

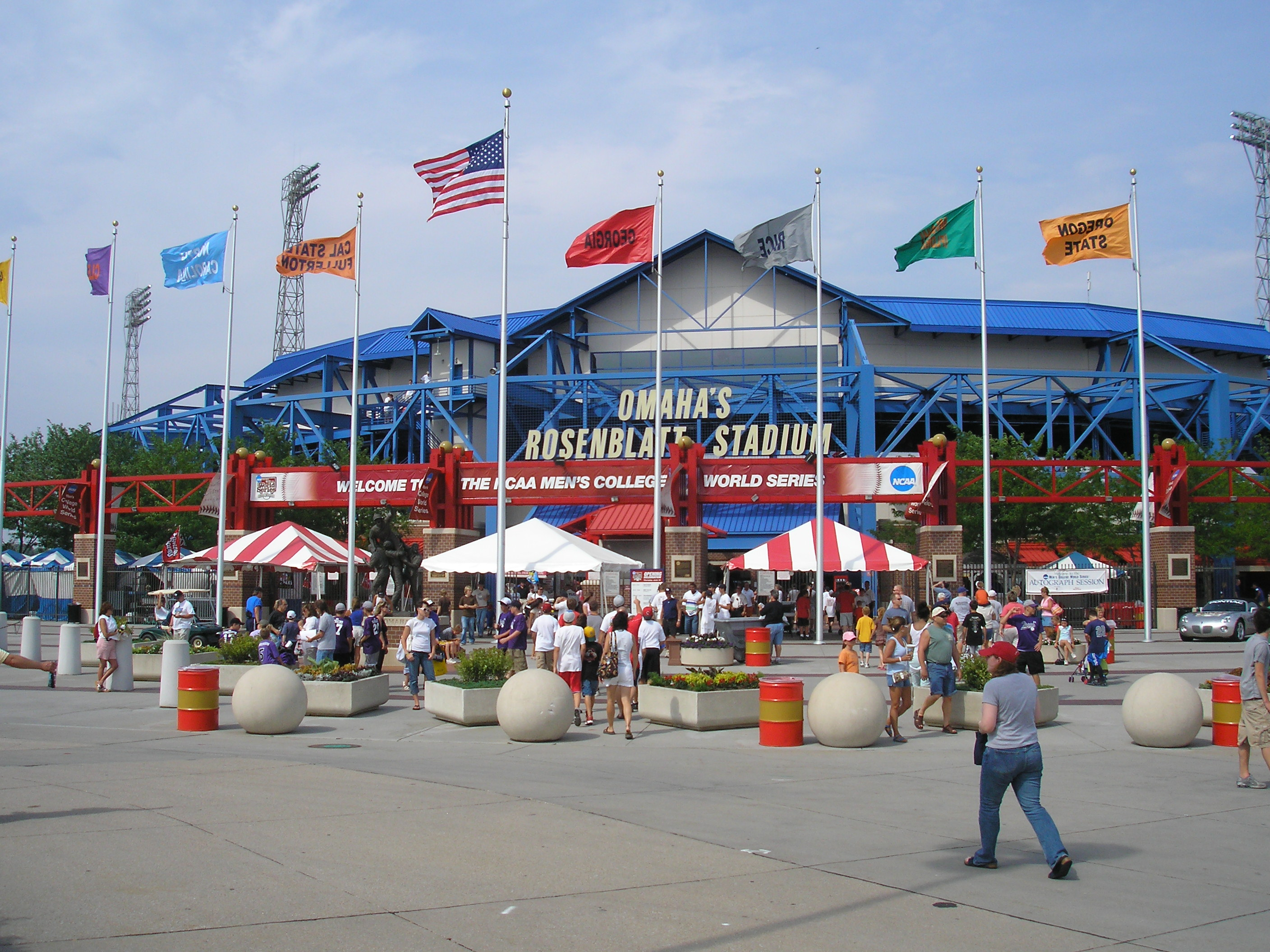
The Omaha Royals played at Johnny Rosenblatt Stadium from 1969 to 2010.

Managed by Jack McKeon in their inaugural 1969 season, the Royals won the American Association championship with an 85–55 record, six games ahead of the second-place Tulsa Oilers. McKeon was selected for the AA Manager of the Year Award. In 1970, he led the Royals to win the Eastern Division title with a 73–65 record. In the best-of-seven postseason playoffs, Omaha defeated the Denver Bears, 4–1, to win their second league championship. They then advanced to the Junior World Series to face the Syracuse Chiefs, champions of the Triple-A International League, but they lost the series, 4–1. McKeon won a second Manager of the Year Award, and outfielder George Spriggs was selected as the AA Most Valuable Player (MVP). Though Omaha was unable to qualify for the playoffs over the next five seasons, two Royals were chosen for league awards during this stretch: second baseman Jim Wohlford as the 1972 Rookie of the Year and Mark Littell as the 1973 Most Valuable Pitcher. Many players from those early teams helped the Major League Royals win four out of five AL West titles from 1976 to 1980, culminating in a World Series appearance in 1980.

In 1976 and 1977, the Royals won back-to-back Eastern Division titles but lost both seasons' league championships to Denver. Outfielder Clint Hurdle was selected as the 1977 AA Rookie of the Year. Behind manager John Sullivan, Omaha won the 1978 Western Division title before winning their third American Association championship over the Indianapolis Indians, 4–1. The team next qualified for the playoffs in 1981 and 1982 but lost in the championship round each time, first to Denver and then Indianapolis. Joe Sparks won the Manager of the Year Award in 1981, and third baseman Manny Castillo was the same season's MVP.

In February 1985, Kansas City sold the Omaha Royals to Chicago businessman Irving "Gus" Cherry for an undisclosed sum, citing financial losses from operating their own Triple-A club; their major league affiliation continued. Meanwhile, in the midst of another postseason drought from 1983 to 1987, Mark Huismann won the 1985 Most Valuable Pitcher Award.

Omaha won three consecutive Western Division titles from 1988 to 1989. On the first two occasions, they lost the AA championship to Indianapolis in the single-round playoffs. First baseman Luis de los Santos was the 1988 league MVP. Then, manager Sal Rende guided the team to a fourth American Association title with a 3–2 series win over the Nashville Sounds in 1990. The Royals capped off the season by winning the Triple-A Classic versus the International League champion Rochester Red Wings, 4–1. Rende was voted the league's Manager of the Year.

The team was sold to the Union Pacific Railroad and minority investors Warren Buffett and Walter Scott for US$5 million following the 1991 season. From 1991 to 1997, the Royals made two postseason appearances in which they were eliminated in both the 1995 and 1996 semifinals. The 1994 season saw outfielder Dwayne Hosey selected as league MVP and first baseman Joe Vitiello win Rookie of the Year.

=== Pacific Coast League (1998–2020) ===
The American Association, of which the Royals had been members since 1969, disbanded after the 1997 season, and its teams were absorbed by the two remaining Triple-A leagues—the International League and Pacific Coast League (PCL). Omaha joined the PCL, becoming one of the easternmost team in the circuit. Though they did not qualify for the playoffs, two Royals outfielders were selected for league awards in the team's first PCL season: Chris Hatcher as the Most Valuable Player and Jeremy Giambi as Rookie of the Year.

The team was briefly known as the Golden Spikes (1999–2001) in honor of the golden spike driven to complete the first transcontinental railroad (shown).

==== First rebranding ====
In early 1998, Omaha began considering a name change to distinguish the Royals from their major league affiliate and to market the minor league club as Omaha's team rather than Kansas City's Triple-A affiliate. Fans and team officials voted to rebrand as the Omaha Golden Spikes beginning with the 1999 seasons. The name was a reference to the golden spike driven at Promontory Summit, Utah, to celebrate the completion of the first transcontinental railroad in 1869. It was intended to celebrate the rich railroad tradition in Omaha, headquarters of the Union Pacific Railroad. The Golden Spikes won the 1999 American Conference Midwest Division title but lost the American Conference title to the Oklahoma RedHawks. Outfielder Mark Quinn was voted the PCL's Rookie of the Year that season.

Union Pacific sold their 50-percent share in the team to Connecticut businessman Matt Minker in early 2001; Buffett and Scott retained their minority interests. Shortly thereafter, the team launched a fan vote to see about changing the team's name, which had been associated with Union Pacific and proved to be unpopular with many fans. As a result, the team switched back to being the Omaha Royals beginning with the 2002 season as fans cited a wish to continue with the tradition associated with the name, which had been in use from 1969 to 1998. Minker later sold his interest in the team to Kentucky businessman Bill Shea in 2006.

From 2000 to 2010, the Royals regularly finished in third or fourth place out of four teams in their division, which left them out of the playoff picture. The team experienced several changes over the next few years. The 2010 season became the last that the team played at Johnny Rosenblatt Stadium, their home field since 1969. The team moved into the new $26-million Werner Park in 2011.

==== Second rebranding ====
Prior to opening Werner Park, the team rebranded as the Omaha Storm Chasers following rounds of fan submissions and voting. The name references storm chasers, people who pursue any severe weather phenomena for various purposes; Nebraska, and Omaha itself, being in Tornado Alley, have been havens for many such chasers.

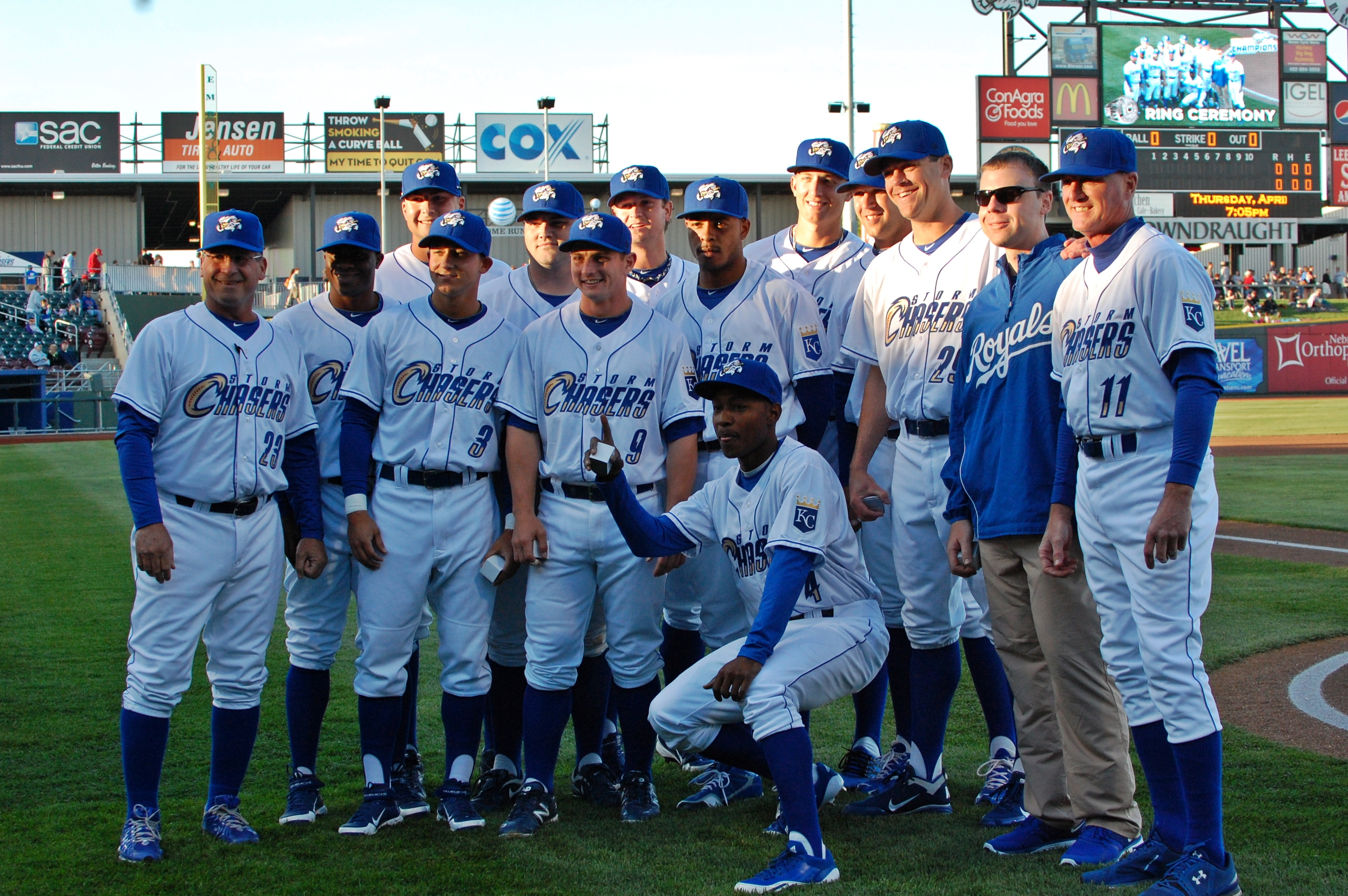
The 2011 Pacific Coast League champion Omaha Storm Chasers

The Storm Chasers played their first home game at Werner Park on April 16, 2011, defeating the Nashville Sounds, 2–1, before 6,533 people in attendance. Manager Mike Jirschele led Omaha to a 79–63 record and the American Conference Northern Division title, which gave the team their first postseason berth since 1999. They defeated the Round Rock Express, 3–1, in the best-of-five American Conference series to advance to the league finals. The Storm Chasers won their first Pacific Coast League championship by sweeping the Sacramento River Cats, 3–0, in the best-of-five championship round. The win gave Omaha a spot in the Triple-A National Championship Game, a single game to determine a champion of Triple-A baseball, versus the International League champion Columbus Clippers, which they lost, 8–3. Jirschele won the Mike Coolbaugh Award, and Luis Mendoza was selected as the PCL Pitcher of the Year.

Jirschele's Storm Chasers returned to the playoffs in 2012 by virtue of winning the division and won a second American Conference title, but they were defeated in the championship round by the Reno Aces, 3–1. In 2013 with Jirschele at the helm, Omaha finished the season at 70–74 with another division title. After besting the Oklahoma City RedHawks, 3–0, for the conference title, they won a second PCL championship over the Salt Lake Bees, 3–1. Returning to the Triple-A National Championship Game, Omaha defeated the International League's Durham Bulls, 2–1, for their first class-level title since 1990. Managed by Brian Poldberg in 2014, Omaha won their fourth consecutive American Conference Northern Division title on the heels of a 76–67 season. After winning the conference title over the Memphis Redbirds, 3–1, Omaha won back-to-back PCL championships with a 3–2 series win over Reno. They also repeated as Triple-A champions by defeating the Pawtucket Red Sox, 4–2.

In the midst of a four-year playoff run, which would be Omaha's last in the PCL, the team's ownership changed hands in 2012. Bill Shea, Warren Buffett, and Walter Scott sold the team to Alliance Baseball LLC, led by managing owner Gary Green. The Storm Chasers did not qualify for the postseason from 2015 to 2019. The start of the 2020 season was initially postponed due to the COVID-19 pandemic before being cancelled altogether.

=== Triple-A East / International League (2021–present) ===
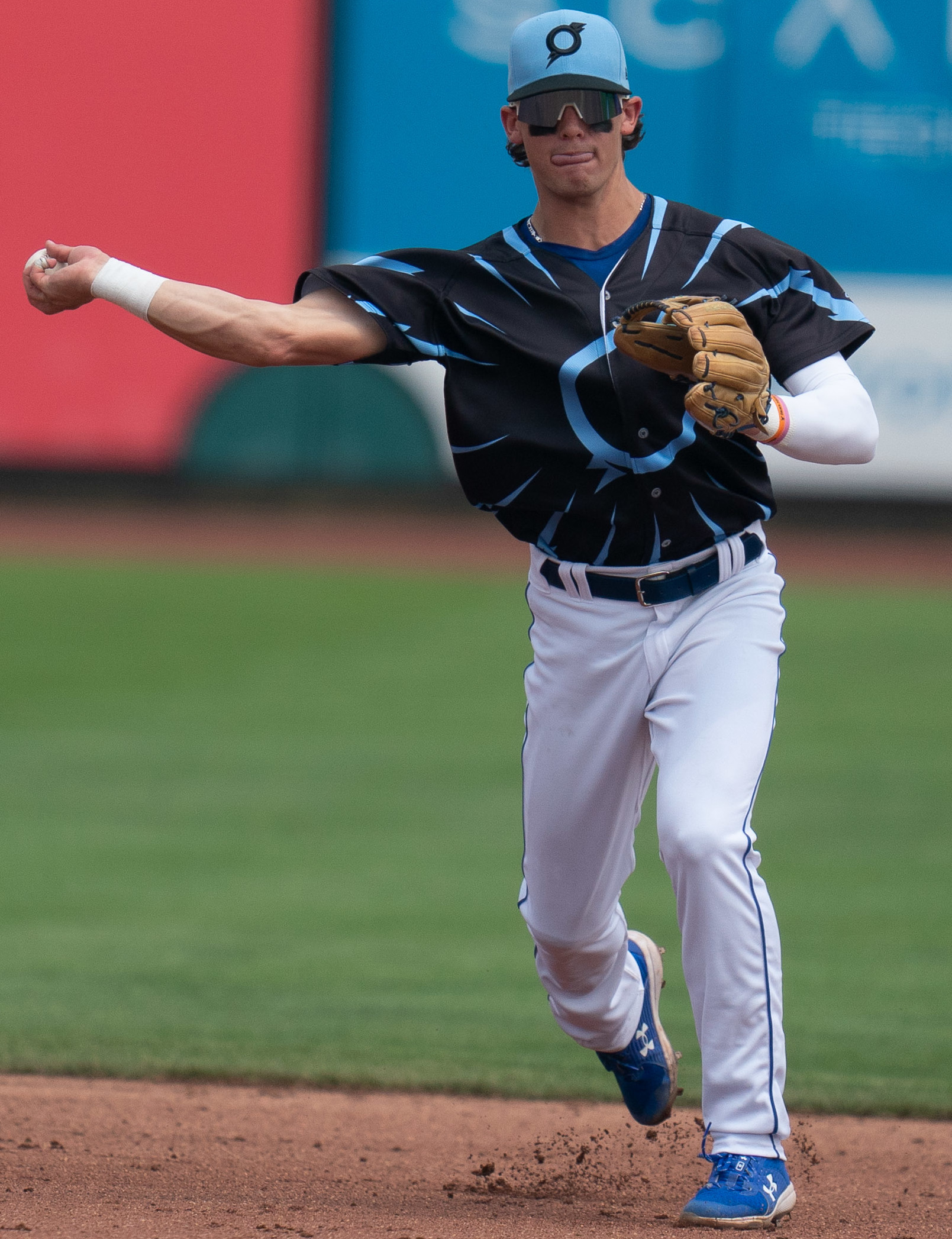
Bobby Witt Jr. was chosen as the 2021 Triple-A East Top MLB Prospect.

In conjunction with Major League Baseball's restructuring of Minor League Baseball in 2021, the Storm Chasers were placed in the Triple-A East. No playoffs were held to determine a league champion; instead, the team with the best regular-season record was declared the winner. Omaha ended the season in eighth place with a 66–54 record. However, 10 games that had been postponed from the start of the season were reinserted into the schedule as a postseason tournament called the Triple-A Final Stretch in which all 30 Triple-A clubs competed for the highest winning percentage. Omaha finished the tournament tied for fourth place with a 7–2 record. Jackson Kowar was selected as the league's Pitcher of the Year, and shortstop Bobby Witt Jr. was chosen as its Top MLB Prospect. In 2022, the Triple-A East became known as the International League (IL), the name historically used by the regional circuit prior to the 2021 reorganization. The Storm Chasers won the first half of the 2024 season en route to the club's first International League championship, which they secured after defeating the Columbus Clippers in a best-of-three series, 2–1. They were defeated by the PCL's Sugar Land Space Cowboys, 13–6, in the Triple-A championship game. Manager Mike Jirschele, who led the team to a league-best 89–59 record, won the IL Manager of the Year Award.

==== Sale ====
In September 2024, owner Gary Green sold the Storm Chasers to Diamond Baseball Holdings in order to focus on the development of USL League One professional soccer team Union Omaha, of which he is also owner.

After Mike Jirschele's retirement in October 2025, the Storm Chasers named Patrick Osborn as the twentieth manager in franchise history on January 16, 2026. Osborn had previously served as bench coach for the team during the 2025 season.

== Season-by-season records ==
Season-by-season records (last five seasons)
Season	League	Regular-season					Postseason			MLB affiliate	Ref.
Season	League	Record	Win %	League	Division	GB	Record	Win %	Result	MLB affiliate	Ref.
2022	IL	71–78	.477	14th	7th	20	—	—	Result	—	Kansas City Royals
2023	IL	68–77	.469	16th	9th	14 1/2	—	—	—	Kansas City Royals	
2024	IL	89–59	.601	1st	1st	—	2–2	.500	Won first-half title Won IL championship vs. Columbus Clippers, 2–1; Lost Triple-A championship vs. Sugar Land Space Cowboys, 1–0	Kansas City Royals	
2025	IL	62–86	.419	17th (tie)	9th (tie)	24 1/2	—	—	—	Kansas City Royals	
2026	IL	65–81	.445	17th	8th	16	—	—	—	Kansas City Royals	
Totals	—	355–381	.482	—	—	—	2–2	.500	—	—	—

== Uniforms ==
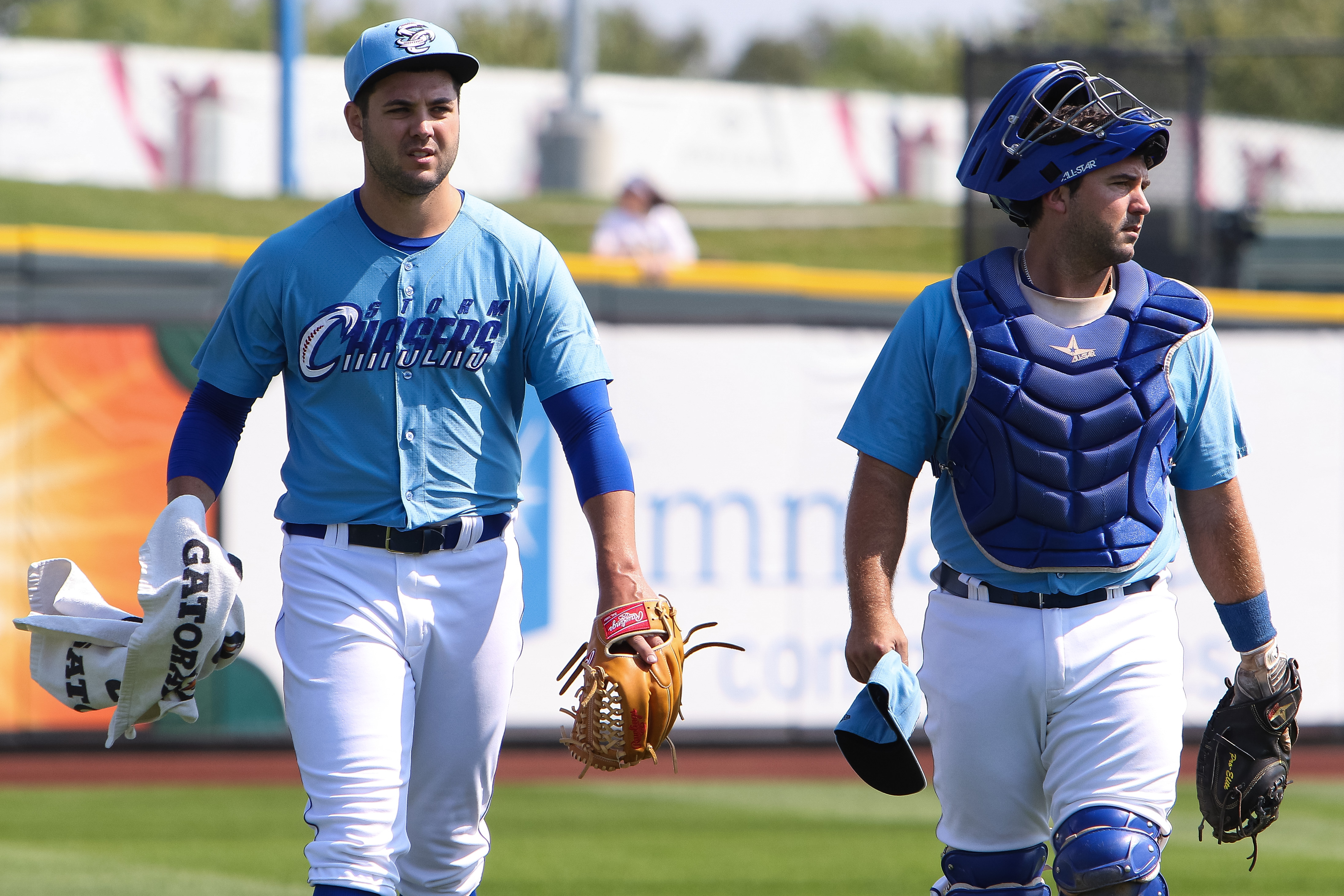
Jakob Junis (left) and Allan de San Miguel (right) wearing Omaha's alternate powder blue jerseys

Omaha has several sets of uniforms. The home whites have "Storm Chasers" across the chest and the player's number below in royal blue and gold, with royal blue piping around the neck, down the center of the jersey, and around the two sleeves. A Kansas City Royals patch adorns the left sleeve. The number on the back is a larger version of the one on the front, with the player's name arching above it in blue. The white pants have a blue line running up both legs and are capped off with a blue belt. The primary hat is solid royal blue with a spinning tornado logo (Vortex) on the front.

One alternate jersey is powder blue with "Storm Chasers" across the front, similar to the home whites. These are often paired with a solid powder blue cap with an interlocking "SC" styled as a mixture of a tornado and a baseball. The player's number is located on the back in white. A second alternate is solid royal blue with a logo on the left chest resembling an "O" with parts of a lightning bolt extending diagonally from the top and bottom. The player's number appears on the back in gold. These are worn with solid blue caps bearing the same gold logo as on the jersey. A third alternate is black with a large O/lightning bolt logo in powder blue on the center with lightning bolts of the same color around the sides of the jersey. The player's name is on the back in powder blue. These are paired with a powder blue cap with a black bill and black O/lightning bolt logo on the front.

== Roster ==
Omaha Storm Chasers roster
Players	Coaches/Other
Pitchers: 44 Scott Alexander; 34 Spencer Bivens *; -- Ethan Bosacker; 28 Lucas Braun; 38 Luke Little *; 47 John Means; 58 Matt Moore; 56 Hunter Owen; 36 Hunter Patteson; 53 Ryan Ramsey; 52 Ben Sears; 43 Vince Velasquez; 59 Henry Williams; Catchers: 19 Jorge Alfaro; 18 Omar Hernández; 17 Elih Marrero; 11 Luca Tresh; Infielders: 35 Colton Becker; 16 Jacob Berry; 12 Alejo Lopez; 3 Jack Pineda; 22 Brett Squires; 21 Abraham Toro; 1 Peyton Wilson; Outfielders: 9 Gavin Cross; 6 Carson Roccaforte; 2 Javier Vaz	Manager: 13 Patrick Osborn; Coaches: -- Dane Johnson (pitching); 7 Tripp Keister (assistant); -- David Lundquist (assistant pitching); 14 Bijan Rademacher (hitting); 60-day injured list: 30 Connor Kaiser; -- Chazz Martinez (full season); 7-day injured list; * On Kansas City Royals 40-man roster; ~ Development list; # Rehab assignment; ∞ Reserve list; ‡ Restricted list; § Suspended list; † Temporarily inactive list; Roster updated October 1, 2026; Transactions; → More rosters: MiLB • International League; → Kansas City Royals minor league players

== Achievements ==
=== Awards ===
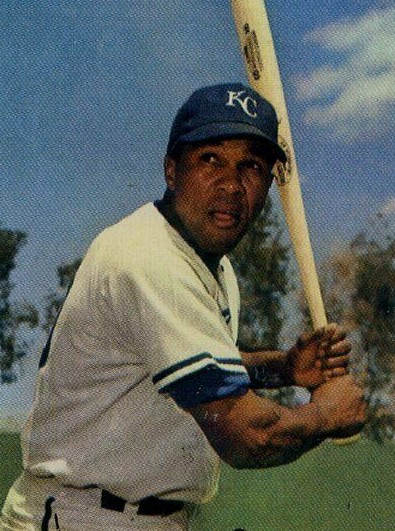
George Spriggs won the 1970 American Association Most Valuable Player Award.

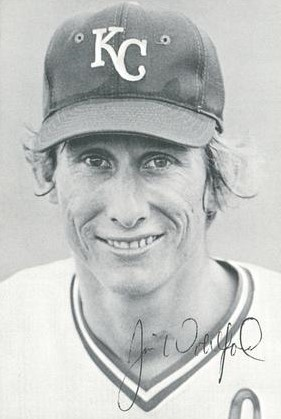
Jim Wohlford won the 1972 American Association Rookie of the Year Award.

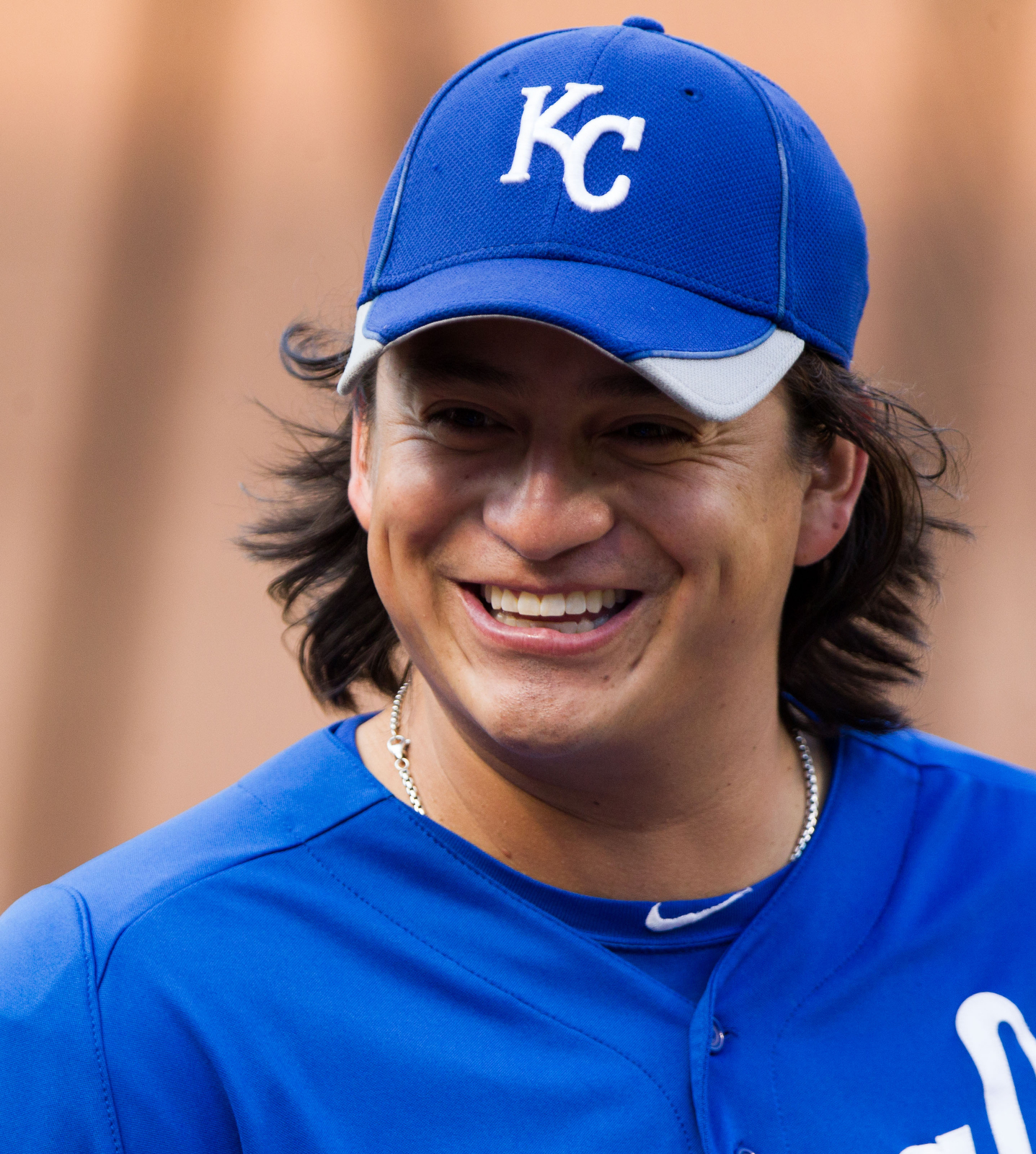
Luis Mendoza won the 2011 Pacific Coast League Pitcher of the Year Award.

One member of the team has received an award issued by Minor League Baseball.

Minor League Baseball awards
Award	Recipient	Season	Ref.
Mike Coolbaugh Award	Mike Jirschele	2011	

Fifteen players and four managers have won league awards in recognition for their performance with Omaha.

American Association awards
Award	Recipient	Season	Ref.
Most Valuable Player	George Spriggs	1970	
Most Valuable Player	Manny Castillo	1981	
Most Valuable Player	Luis de los Santos	1988	
Most Valuable Player	Dwayne Hosey	1994	
Most Valuable Pitcher	Mark Littell	1973	
Most Valuable Pitcher	Mark Huismann	1985	
Rookie of the Year	Jim Wohlford	1972	
Rookie of the Year	Clint Hurdle	1977	
Rookie of the Year	Joe Vitiello	1994	
Manager of the Year	Joe Sparks	1981	
Manager of the Year	Jack McKeon	1969	
Manager of the Year	Jack McKeon	1970	
Manager of the Year	Sal Rende	1990	

Pacific Coast League awards
Award	Recipient	Season	Ref.
Most Valuable Player	Chris Hatcher	1998	
Pitcher of the Year	Luis Mendoza	2011	
Rookie of the Year	Jeremy Giambi	1998	
Rookie of the Year	Mark Quinn	1999	

Triple-A East / International League awards
Award	Recipient	Season	Ref.
Pitcher of the Year	Jackson Kowar	2021	
Top MLB Prospect	Bobby Witt Jr.	2021	
Manager of the Year	Mike Jirschele	2024	

=== Retired numbers ===
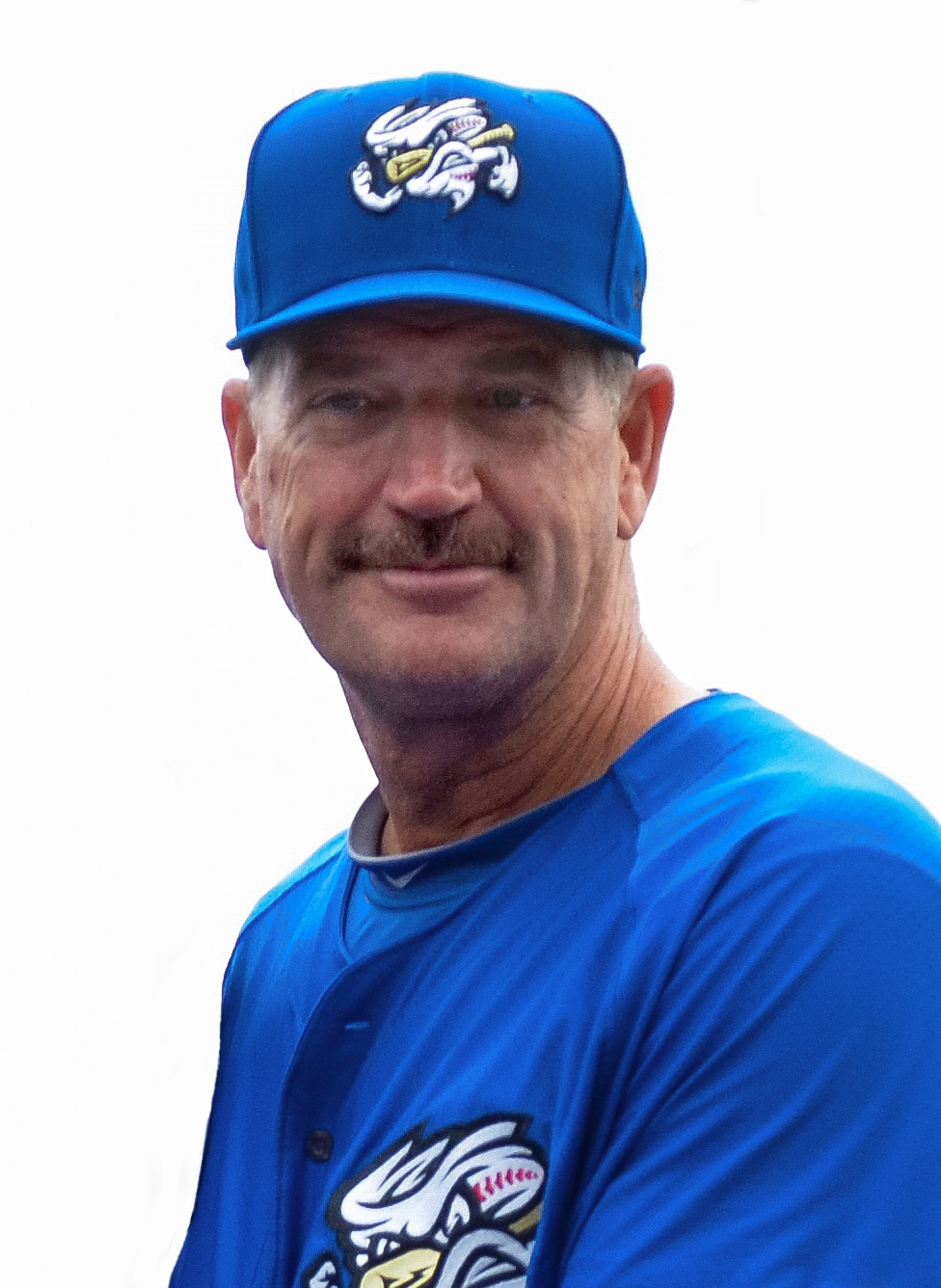
The number 27 was retired in honor of former catcher and manager Brian Poldberg.

The Storm Chasers have honored six individuals by retiring their uniform numbers. This ensures that the number will be associated with one player of particular importance to the team. The Kansas City Royals' retired numbers are also retired throughout their minor league organization. Three such numbers (5, 10, and 20) are thusly also retired in Omaha, while two others (23 and 27) are retired for Omaha personnel. An additional number (42) was retired across professional baseball to honor Jackie Robinson, the first African American to play in Major League Baseball in the modern era.

No.	Name	Season(s)	Position	Ref.
5	George Brett	1973–1974	Omaha infielder	
10	Dick Howser	1981–1987	Kansas City manager	
20	Frank White	1973	Omaha infielder	
23	Mike Jirschele	1988–1989 / 1995–1997, 2003–2013, 2023–present	Omaha infielder / manager	
27	Brian Poldberg	1983–1985 / 2014–2021	Omaha catcher / manager	
31	Jack McKeon	1979–1982	Omaha manager	
42	Jackie Robinson	—	Second baseman	

== Ownership ==
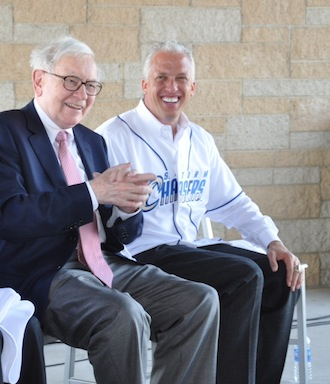
Warren Buffett (left) was a minority shareholder from 1991 to 2012, and Gary Green (right) was the managing owner from 2012 to 2024.

Since being established in 1969, Omaha has had seven majority owners.

Seasons	Owner(s)	Ref.
1969–1985	Kansas City Royals	
1985–1991	Gus Cherry	
1991–2001	Union Pacific Railroad (majority), Warren Buffett and Walter Scott (minority)	
2001–2006	Matt Minker (majority), Warren Buffett and Walter Scott (minority)	
2006–2012	Bill Shea (majority), Warren Buffett and Walter Scott (minority)	
2012–2024	Alliance Baseball, LLC (Gary Green, managing owner)	
2024-	Diamond Baseball Holdings	
