= American Association (1902–1997) Manager of the Year Award =

American Association Manager of the Year Award
- Sport: Baseball
- League: American Association
- Awarded for: Best regular-season manager in the American Association
- Country: United States
- Presented by: American Association

History
- First award: George Selkirk (1953)
- Final award: Dave Miley (1997)
- Most wins: Joe Sparks (5)

The American Association Manager of the Year Award was an annual award given to the best manager in Minor League Baseball's American Association based on their regular-season performance. Though the league was established in 1902, the award was not created until 1953. It continued to be issued through the 1962 season, after which the league disbanded. In 1969, both the league and the award were revived, and the honor continued to be given until the league disbanded for a second time after the 1997 season.

Nine managers won the award on multiple occasions. Joe Sparks won the award five times, more than any other manager. Marc Bombard and Vern Rapp each won three times. Kerby Farrell, Jim Fregosi, Jim Marshall, Gene Mauch, Jack McKeon, and Rick Renick each won the award twice. Sparks (1986, 1987, and 1988) won three of his five awards consecutively, while Mauch (1958 and 1959), McKeon (1969 and 1970), and Bombard (1994 and 1995) won in back-to-back seasons.

Fourteen managers from the Indianapolis Indians won the Manager of the Year Award, more than any other team in the league, followed by the Denver Zephyrs and Omaha Royals (4); the Evansville Triplets and Minneapolis Millers (3); the Iowa Cubs, Louisville Redbirds, Nashville Sounds, and Wichita Aeros (2); and the Buffalo Bisons, Louisville Colonels, Oklahoma City 89ers, Omaha Dodgers, and Toledo Sox (1).

Eight managers from the Montreal Expos Major League Baseball (MLB) organization won the award, more than any other, followed by the Cincinnati Reds organization (6); the Chicago White Sox and Kansas City Royals organizations (4); the Detroit Tigers and Milwaukee Braves organizations (3); the Boston Red Sox, Chicago Cubs, Cleveland Indians, and St. Louis Cardinals organizations (2); and the Los Angeles Dodgers, Milwaukee Brewers, New York Giants, Pittsburgh Pirates, and Texas Rangers organizations (1).

== Winners ==
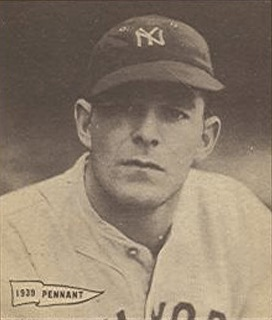
George Selkirk won the first American Association Manager of the Year Award in 1953.

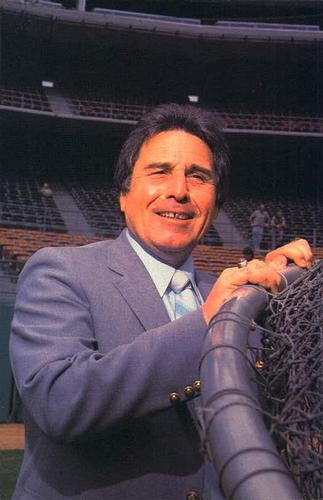
Jack McKeon, the 1969 and 1970 winner, was selected as the National League Manager of the Year in 1999 and 2003.

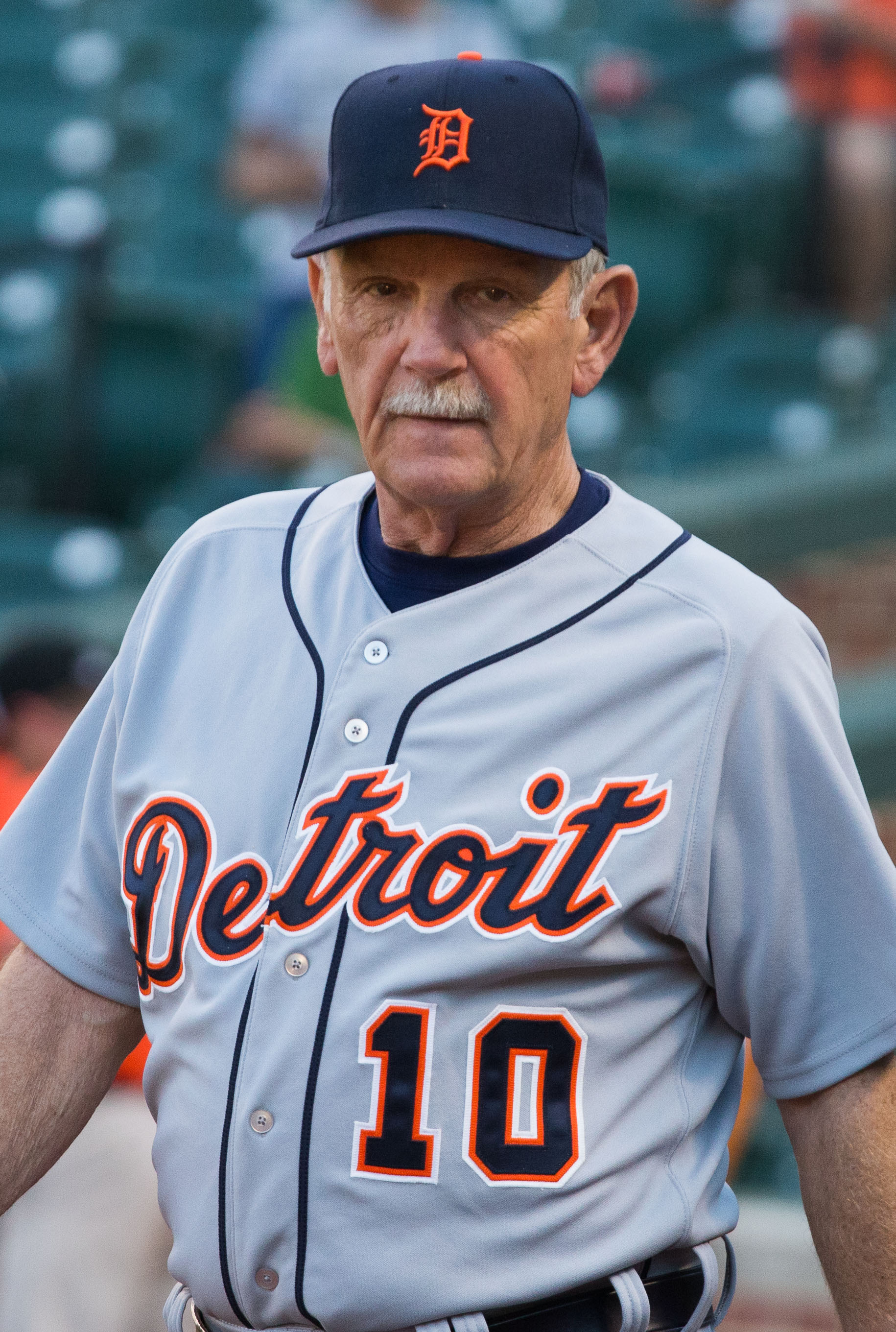
Jim Leyland, the 1979 Manager of the Year, won three MLB Manager of the Year Awards (1990, 1992, & 2006).

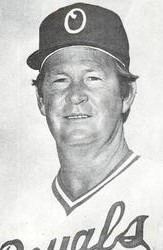
Joe Sparks won the award five times, more than any other manager.

Key
League	The team's final position in the league standings
Division	The team's final position in the divisional standings (Note: Positions are absent from seasons in which the league was not split into divisions.)
Record	The team's wins and losses during the regular season
(#)	Number of wins by managers who won the award multiple times
^	Indicates multiple award winners in the same year
*	Indicates league champions

Winners
Year	Winner	Team	Organization	League	Division	Record	Refs.
1953	George Selkirk	Toledo Sox	Milwaukee Braves	1st	—	90–64	
1954	Kerby Farrell (1)	Indianapolis Indians	Cleveland Indians	1st	—	95–57	
1955	Bill Rigney	Minneapolis Millers*	New York Giants	1st	—	92–62	
1956	Kerby Farrell (2)	Indianapolis Indians*	Cleveland Indians	1st	—	92–62	
1957	Ben Geraghty	Wichita Braves	Milwaukee Braves	1st	—	93–61	
1958	Gene Mauch (1)	Minneapolis Millers*	Boston Red Sox	3rd	—	82–71	
1959	Gene Mauch (2)	Minneapolis Millers*	Boston Red Sox	2nd	2nd	95–67	
1960	Bill Adair	Louisville Colonels*	Milwaukee Braves	2nd	—	85–68	
1961	Cot Deal	Indianapolis Indians	Cincinnati Reds	1st	—	86–64	
1962^	Luke Appling	Indianapolis Indians	Chicago White Sox	1st	—	89–58	
1962^	Danny Ozark	Omaha Dodgers	Los Angeles Dodgers	2nd	—	79–68	
1969	Jack McKeon (1)	Omaha Royals*	Kansas City Royals	1st	—	85–55	
1970	Jack McKeon (2)	Omaha Royals*	Kansas City Royals	1st	1st	73–65	
1971	Vern Rapp (1)	Indianapolis Indians	Cincinnati Reds	1st	1st	84–55	
1972	Jim Marshall (1)	Wichita Aeros	Chicago Cubs	1st	1st	87–53	
1973	Joe Sparks (1)	Iowa Oaks	Chicago White Sox	1st	1st	83–53	
1974	Vern Rapp (2)	Indianapolis Indians	Cincinnati Reds	1st	1st	78–57	
1975	Fred Hatfield	Evansville Triplets*	Detroit Tigers	2nd	1st	77–59	
1976	Vern Rapp (3)	Denver Bears*	Montreal Expos	1st	1st	86–50	
1977	Jim Marshall (2)	Denver Bears*	Montreal Expos	3rd	1st	71–65	
1978	Les Moss	Evansville Triplets	Detroit Tigers	2nd	2nd	78–58	
1979	Jim Leyland	Evansville Triplets*	Detroit Tigers	1st	1st	78–58	
1980	Billy Gardner	Denver Bears	Montreal Royals	1st	1st	92–44	
1981	Joe Sparks (2)	Omaha Royals	Kansas City Royals	1st	1st	79–57	
1982	Jim Napier	Iowa Cubs	Chicago Cubs	2nd (tie)	2nd (tie)	73–62	
1983	Jim Fregosi (1)	Louisville Redbirds	St. Louis Cardinals	1st	1st	78–57	
1984	Buck Rogers	Indianapolis Indians	Montreal Expos	1st	—	91–63	
1985^	Jim Fregosi (2)	Louisville Redbirds*	St. Louis Cardinals	3rd	1st	74–68	
1985^	Dave Oliver	Oklahoma City 89ers	Texas Rangers	1st	1st	79–63	
1986	Joe Sparks (3)	Indianapolis Indians*	Montreal Expos	1st	1st	80–62	
1987	Joe Sparks (4)	Indianapolis Indians*	Montreal Expos	3rd	—	74–64	
1988	Joe Sparks (5)	Indianapolis Indians*	Montreal Expos	1st	1st	89–53	
1989	Tom Runnells	Indianapolis Indians*	Montreal Expos	1st	1st	87–59	
1990	Sal Rende	Omaha Royals*	Kansas City Royals	1st	1st	86–60	
1991	Tony Muser	Denver Zephyrs*	Milwaukee Brewers	2nd	1st	79–65	
1992	Marc Bombard (1)	Buffalo Bisons	Pittsburgh Pirates	1st	1st	87–57	
1993	Rick Renick (1)	Nashville Sounds	Chicago White Sox	2nd	1st	81–62	
1994	Marc Bombard (2)	Indianapolis Indians*	Cincinnati Reds	1st	—	86–57	
1995	Marc Bombard (3)	Indianapolis Indians	Cincinnati Reds	1st	—	88–56	
1996	Rick Renick (2)	Nashville Sounds	Chicago White Sox	4th	3rd	77–67	
1997	Dave Miley	Indianapolis Indians	Cincinnati Reds	2nd	2nd	89–59	

== Wins by team ==
Team	Award(s)	Year(s)
Indianapolis Indians	14	1954, 1956, 1961, 1962, 1971, 1974, 1984, 1986, 1987, 1988, 1989, 1994, 1995, 1997
Denver Zephyrs (Denver Bears)	4	1976, 1977, 1980, 1991
Omaha Royals	4	1969, 1970, 1981, 1990
Evansville Triplets	3	1975, 1978, 1979
Minneapolis Millers	3	1955, 1958, 1959
Iowa Cubs (Iowa Oaks)	2	1973, 1982
Louisville Redbirds	2	1983, 1985
Nashville Sounds	2	1993, 1996
Wichita Aeros (Wichita Aeros)	2	1957, 1972
Buffalo Bisons	1	1992
Louisville Colonels	1	1960
Oklahoma City 89ers	1	1985
Omaha Dodgers	1	1962
Toledo Sox	1	1953

== Wins by organization ==
Organization	Award(s)	Year(s)
Montreal Expos	8	1976, 1977, 1980, 1984, 1986, 1987, 1988, 1989
Cincinnati Reds	6	1961, 1971, 1974, 1994, 1995, 1997
Chicago White Sox	4	1962, 1973, 1993, 1996
Kansas City Royals	4	1969, 1970, 1981, 1990
Detroit Tigers	3	1975, 1978, 1979
Milwaukee Braves	3	1953, 1957, 1960
Boston Red Sox	2	1958, 1959
Chicago Cubs	2	1972, 1982
Cleveland Indians	2	1954, 1956
St. Louis Cardinals	2	1983, 1985
Los Angeles Dodgers	1	1962
Milwaukee Brewers	1	1991
New York Giants	1	1955
Pittsburgh Pirates	1	1992
Texas Rangers	1	1985
