= Evansville Triplets =

- 1970–1984; Evansville, Indiana
Team logo
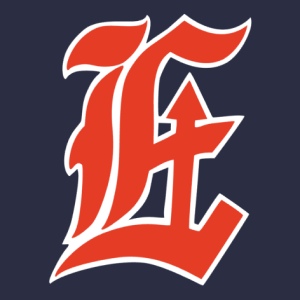
Cap insignia

Minor league affiliations
- Class: Triple-A (1970–1984)
- League: American Association (1970–1984)

Major league affiliations
- Team: Detroit Tigers (1974–1984); Milwaukee Brewers (1971–1973); Minnesota Twins (1970)

Minor league titles
- Class titles (1): 1975
- League titles (3): 1972; 1975; 1979
- Division titles (4): 1972; 1975; 1979; 1981

Team data
- Name: Evansville Triplets (1970–1984)
- Ballpark: Bosse Field (1970–1984)

The Evansville Triplets were a Minor League Baseball team of the Triple-A American Association (AA) from 1970 to 1984. They were located in Evansville, Indiana, and played their home games at Bosse Field. The Triplets served as a farm club for three major league franchises: the Minnesota Twins (1970), Milwaukee Brewers (1971–1973), and Detroit Tigers (1974–1984).

The Triplets were established in 1970 as an expansion team in conjunction with the 1969 Major League Baseball expansion. In 1984, the team was sold to Larry Schmittou and other owners of the Nashville Sounds of the Double-A Southern League, who relocated the team to Nashville, Tennessee, in 1985.

Over 15 seasons of play, Evansville played in 2,061 regular season games and compiled a win–loss record of 1,032–1,026–3 (.501). They reached the postseason on four occasions. They won the American Association championship in 1972 as the Triple-A affiliate of the Milwaukee Brewers. They later won two additional American Association titles with the Detroit Tigers (1975 and 1979). The 1975 club also won the Junior World Series. The Triplets had an overall postseason record of 16–8 (.667).

== History ==
Due to the 1969 Major League Baseball expansion, there was a need for two additional Triple-A teams in the American Association for the 1970 season. One went to Wichita, Kansas, the other to Evansville, Indiana, which had previously hosted Minor League Baseball teams but never above the Double-A classification. A contest was held to select a name for the new franchise. "Evansville Triplets" was selected from over 3,000 entries. The fitting name refers to the team playing at the Triple-A level and that the team would represent not just Indiana, but the entire tri-state area, including Kentucky and Illinois. It was also a word play on the Minnesota Twins, Evansville's first major league affiliate. The new team would play at Bosse Field, which opened in 1915.

After spending their inaugural 1970 season affiliated with the Minnesota Twins, Evansville then spent the next three seasons with the Milwaukee Brewers. In 1972, the Triplets won their first American Association championship against their expansion partner, the Wichita Aeros, 3–0. Lloyd Gladden won the 1972 American Association Most Valuable Pitcher Award having pitched to a 15–9 record with a 2.71 earned run average and 141 strikeouts.

The Triplets enjoyed their greatest success as the top minor league affiliate of the Detroit Tigers from 1974 to 1984. The team won their second AA title in 1975 by defeating the Denver Bears, 4–2. They went on to win the Junior World Series, 4–1, against the Tidewater Tides. Manager Fred Hatfield won the 1975 American Association Manager of the Year Award. Les Moss won the same award in 1978). Under Manager of the Year Jim Leyland, the 1979 club won a third AA championship, 4–2, over the Oklahoma City 89ers. Billy Gardner was selected as the AA's 1980 Manager of the Year.

In July 1984, the team's owners arrived at terms to sell the Triplets for a reported sum of US$780,000 to the owners of the Nashville Sounds, a Double-A club of the Southern League, who intended to move the franchise to Nashville, Tennessee, for the 1985 season. The Southern League wanted team president Larry Schmittou to surrender his franchise to the league, but he wanted to send Nashville's existing Southern League franchise to Evansville to continue as the Triplets at Double-A. However, a combination of the league's disapproval of the move and the City of Evansville being unwilling to upgrade Bosse Field meant the end of affiliated baseball in Evansville. The Triplets' legacy was retired, and the Triple-A Sounds carried on the history of the preceding Double-A team, which relocated to Alabama and became the Huntsville Stars.

== Season-by-season results ==
Season	Regular season					Postseason			MLB affiliate	Ref.
Season	Record	Win %	League	Division	GB	Record	Win %	Result	MLB affiliate	Ref.
1970	67–71	.486	7th	4th	6	—	—	—	Minnesota Twins	
1971	60–78–2	.435	8th	4th	23 1/2	—	—	—	Milwaukee Brewers	
1972	83–57	.593	2nd	1st	—	3–0	1.000	Won AA championship vs Wichita Aeros, 3–0	Milwaukee Brewers	
1973	66–70	.485	5th	3rd	17	—	—	—	Milwaukee Brewers	
1974	68–67	.504	4th	3rd	10	—	—	—	Detroit Tigers	
1975	77–59–1	.566	2nd	1st	—	8–3	.727	Won AA championship vs Denver Bears, 4–2; Won Junior World Series vs Tidewater Tides, 4–1	Detroit Tigers	
1976	55–81	.404	8th	4th	23	—	—	—	Detroit Tigers	
1977	65–68	.489	6th	3rd	10	—	—	—	Detroit Tigers	
1978	78–58	.574	2nd	2nd	1/2	—	—	—	Detroit Tigers	
1979	78–58	.574	1st	1st	—	4–2	.667	Won AA championship vs Oklahoma City 89ers, 4–2	Detroit Tigers	
1980	61–74	.452	5th (tie)	2nd	13 1/2	—	—	—	Detroit Tigers	
1981	73–63	.537	3rd	1st	—	1–3	.250	Lost semi-finals vs Denver Bears, 3–1	Detroit Tigers	
1982	68–65	.511	5th (tie)	4th	5 1/2	—	—	—	Detroit Tigers	
1983	61–75	.449	8th	4th	17 1/2	—	—	—	Detroit Tigers	
1984	72–82	.468	6th	6th	19	—	—	—	Detroit Tigers	
Totals	1,032–1,026–3	.501	—	—	—	16–8	.667	1 Class title, 3 League titles	—	—

== Notable alumni ==
- Bert Blyleven
- Del Crandall, manager (1970–71)
- Mark Fidrych
- Kirk Gibson
- Howard Johnson
- Ruppert Jones
- Gene Lamont
- Ron LeFlore
- Jim Leyland, manager (1979–1981)
- Aurelio López
- Jack Morris
- Lance Parrish
- Dan Petry
- Milt Wilcox
- Darrell Porter
- Early Wynn, interim manager (1970)

== See also ==
- Sports in Evansville
