= Frank Gilhooley =

American baseball player (1892–1959)

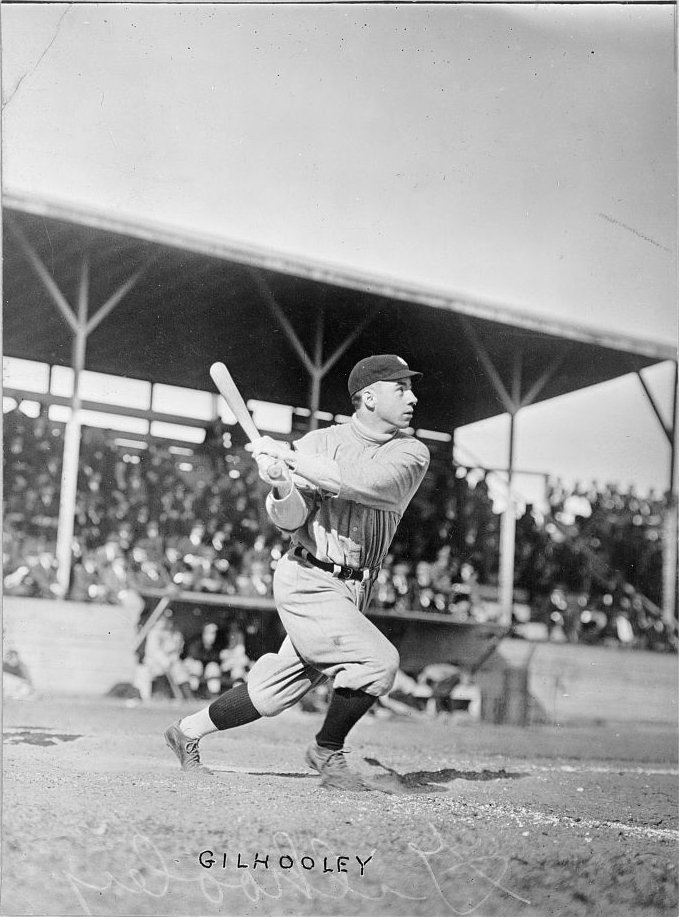
- Gilhooley with the New York Yankees
- Right fielder
- Born: June 10, 1892; Toledo, Ohio, U.S.
- Died: July 11, 1959 (aged 67); Toledo, Ohio, U.S.
- Batted: Left Threw: Right

MLB debut
- September 18, 1911, for the St. Louis Cardinals

Last MLB appearance
- September 24, 1919, for the Boston Red Sox

MLB statistics
- Batting average: .271
- Home runs: 2
- Runs batted in: 58
- Stats at Baseball Reference

Teams
- St. Louis Cardinals (1911–1912); New York Yankees (1913–1918); Boston Red Sox (1919)

Francis Patrick Gilhooley Sr. (June 10, 1892 – July 11, 1959) was an American outfielder in Major League Baseball, playing mostly as a right fielder from 1911 through 1919 for the St. Louis Cardinals (1911–1912), New York Yankees (1913–1918) and Boston Red Sox (1919). Listed at 5 ft 8 in (1.73 m), 155 lb., Gilhooley batted left-handed and threw right-handed.

== Early life ==
He was born in Toledo, Ohio, and attended Central Catholic High School there.

== Professional career ==
In a nine-season career, Gilhooley was a .271 hitter (289-for-1068) with two home runs and 58 RBI in 312 games, including 142 runs, 30 doubles 10 triples, 37 stolen bases, and a .357 on-base percentage. His most productive season came with the 1918 Yankees, when he appeared in a career-high 112 games while hitting .276 with 23 RBI, 59 runs and 19 extrabases, also career-numbers.

As an outfielder, Gilhooley played 285 games at right field (236), left (30) and center (19), recording a collective .957 fielding percentage.

He was later the player-manager of the Jersey City Skeeters in the International League in 1928 and 1929.

== Personal life ==
He married Mae Casey in 1917, and had 3 children, Mary Irene, Mary Frances and Frank Jr. Frank Jr. announced for the Toledo Mud Hens and was also the sports director at WTVG-TV, Channel 13, until 1986.

Gilhooley died at Mercy Health St. Vincent Medical Center in Toledo, Ohio on July 11, 1959 at the age of 67.
