= Indianapolis Indians =

Minor League Baseball team in Indianapolis, Indiana

- Founded in 1902; Indianapolis, Indiana

Team logo	Cap insignia

Minor league affiliations
- Class: Triple-A (1946–present)
- Previous classes: Double-A (1912–1945); Class A (1903–1911); Independent (1902)
- League: International League (1998–present)
- Division: West Division
- Previous leagues: American Association (1969–1997); Pacific Coast League (1964–1968); International League (1963); American Association (1902–1962)

Major league affiliations
- Team: Pittsburgh Pirates (2005–present)
- Previous teams: Milwaukee Brewers (2000–2004); Cincinnati Reds (1993–1999); Montreal Expos (1984–1992); Cincinnati Reds (1968–1983); Chicago White Sox (1962–1967); Cincinnati Reds (1961); Philadelphia Phillies (1960); Chicago White Sox (1957–1959); Cleveland Indians (1952–1956); Pittsburgh Pirates (1948–1951); Boston Braves (1946–1947); Cincinnati Reds (1939–1941)

Minor league titles
- Class titles (7): 1917; 1928; 1949; 1956; 1988; 1989; 2000
- League titles (14): 1902; 1908; 1917; 1928; 1949; 1956; 1963; 1982; 1986; 1987; 1988; 1989; 1994; 2000
- Division titles (13): 1963; 1971; 1974; 1978; 1982; 1986; 1988; 1989; 2000; 2012; 2013; 2015; 2017
- Wild card berths (1): 2005

Team data
- Name: Indianapolis Indians (1902–present)
- Colors: Navy blue, scarlet, gold, white
- Mascot: Rowdie
- Ballpark: Victory Field (1996–present)
- Previous parks: Owen J. Bush Stadium (1931–1996); West Washington Park (1905–1931); East Washington Park (1902–1904)
- Owner(s)/ Operator(s): Indians, Inc.
- President: Randy Lewandowski
- General manager: Randy Lewandowski
- Manager: Eric Patterson
- Media: MiLB.TV and Fox Sports 1260 AM
- Website: milb.com/indianapolis

The Indianapolis Indians are a Minor League Baseball team of the International League (IL) and the Triple-A affiliate of the Pittsburgh Pirates. They are located in Indianapolis, Indiana, and play their home games at Victory Field, which opened in 1996. The Indians previously played at Owen J. Bush Stadium from 1931 to 1996 and at two versions of Washington Park from 1902 to 1931.

Indianapolis is the second-oldest minor league franchise in American professional baseball (after the Rochester Red Wings). The team originated in 1902 as members of the American Association (AA), which was an independent league at the time but was granted Class A status in 1903. Since then, the Indians have played at the highest level of Minor League Baseball, though the terminology has changed. Indianapolis remained in the AA until the league disbanded after the 1962 season. They were briefly members of the International League (1963) and Pacific Coast League (1964–1968) before returning to the revived American Association in 1969. When the league dissolved a second time after the 1997 season, the Indians rejoined the IL in 1998. In conjunction with Major League Baseball's restructuring of the minors in 2021, they were shifted to the Triple-A East, but this was renamed the International League in 2022.

Indianapolis has won 14 league championships. They were American Association champions twelve times (1902, 1908, 1917, 1928, 1949, 1956, 1982, 1986, 1987, 1988, 1989, and 1994). The Indians have won the International League championship twice (1963 and 2000). They have also won two Little World Series (1917 and 1928), two Junior World Series (1949 and 1956), two Triple-A Classics (1988 and 1989), and one Triple-A World Series (2000).

== History ==
=== Prior professional baseball in Indianapolis ===
Indianapolis has been home to professional baseball teams since the late 19th century. The city's first Minor League Baseball team was the Indianapolis Blues, who played in the League Alliance in 1877. They joined the major league ranks in 1878 as members of the National League. After a five-year hiatus, they were followed by several teams called the Indianapolis Hoosiers. The first Hoosiers played in the major league American Association in 1884. The second Hoosiers were members of the minor Western League in 1885. The third Hoosiers were part of the National League from 1887 to 1889. Other minor league Hoosiers played in the Western League/minor American League in 1892 and from 1894 to 1900 and in the Western Association in 1901.

=== American Association (1902–1962) ===
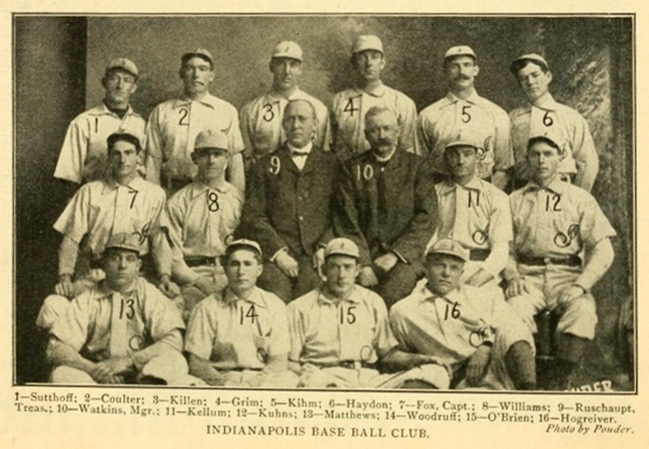
The 1902 Indianapolis Indians, winners of the first American Association championship

In 1902, Bill Watkins and Charles Ruschaupt established the Indianapolis Indians as charter members of a new minor league American Association (AA). The league was an independent or "outlaw league" outside the umbrella of the National Association of Professional Baseball Leagues. The circuit was granted Class A status, the highest level of the minors, in 1903. Since then, the Indians have remained at the top level of Minor League Baseball, though the terminology has changed: Class A (1903–1911), Double-A (1912–1945), and Triple-A (since 1946). The Indians' first home ballpark was East Washington Park.

The 1902 Indians, managed by Watkins, won the first American Association championship with a 96–45 record, two games ahead of the second-place Louisville Colonels. The team was ranked as the 27th greatest minor league baseball team of all-time by baseball historians in 2001.

Ruschaupt became the principal owner in 1904, and Indianapolis began playing at West Washington Park in 1905. The Indians won their next AA pennant in 1908 with a 92–61 season, four games ahead of Louisville, under manager Charlie Carr. Sol Meyer and Sol Kiser purchased the team in 1913 but sold the team to James C. McGill and William G. Smith Sr. in 1914. McGill became the principal owner in 1917 and Smith in 1921.

Led by Jack Hendricks, the 1917 Indians won a third AA title with a 90–63 season, which placed them two-and-a-half games ahead of Louisville and the St. Paul Saints. The pennant win qualified Indianapolis for the Little World Series against the champions of the International League, the Toronto Maple Leafs. The Indians won the best-of-seven series, 4–1.

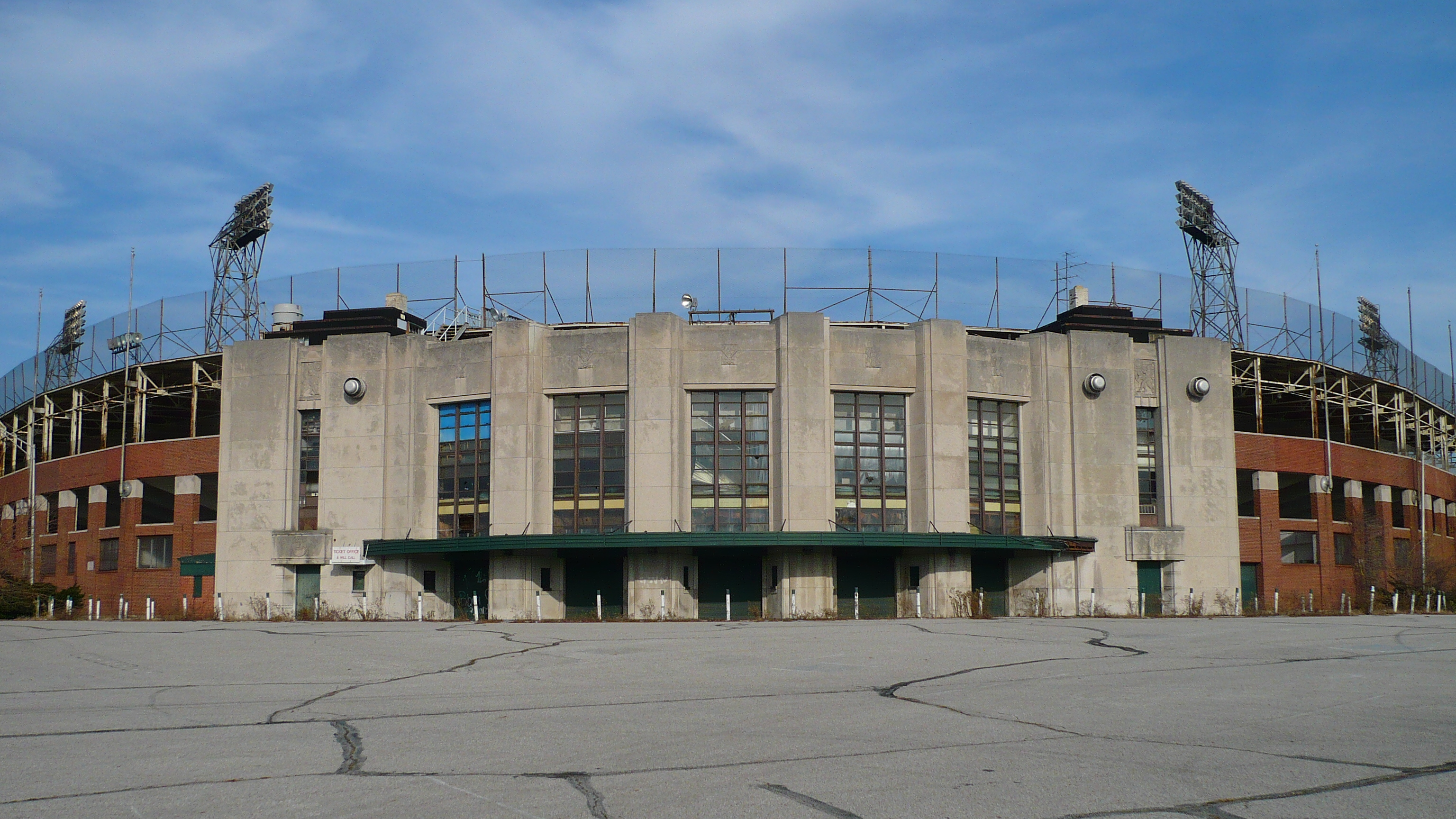
The Indians played at Owen J. Bush Stadium from 1931 to 1996.

James A. Perry purchased the club in 1927. He died in a plane crash two years later, and his brother, Norman Perry, assumed ownership in 1929. Late in the 1931 season, the team moved to Perry Stadium, which was renamed Victory Field in 1942 and Bush Stadium in 1967. The 1928 Indians, who were managed by Bruno Betzel, won a fourth AA pennant by finishing two-and-a-half games ahead of the Minneapolis Millers at 99–68. They then defeated the Rochester Red Wings, 5–1, in the Little World Series.

From 1936 to 1946, Indianapolis qualified for the American Association playoffs on six occasions, but failed to win a championship. Meanwhile, Frank E. McKinney and Owen J. "Donie" Bush purchased the team in December 1941. The Indians entered into their first major league affiliation in 1939 and 1940 as the top farm club of the Cincinnati Reds. They returned to being an unaffiliated team from 1942 to 1945 before affiliating with the Boston Braves in 1946.

Indianapolis became the Triple-A affiliate of the Pittsburgh Pirates in 1947. The 1948 Indians posted a 100–54 record, a franchise high, but were eliminated in the playoff semifinals by St. Paul. The team was ranked as the 85th greatest minor league team in a 2001 ranking. Al López, who had managed the 1948 club, led the 1949 Indians back to the playoffs. They defeated Minneapolis, 4–3, in the semifinals and the Milwaukee Brewers, 4–3, in the final round, to win their first playoff title and fifth AA championship. In the Junior World Series, a successor to the Little World Series, Indianapolis defeated the Montreal Royals, 4–2. They made one more playoff appearance as a Pirates farm club in 1950 but lost in the championship finals.

The Cleveland Indians purchased the team in 1952, and made them their Triple-A affiliate. Over the five-year relationship, Indianapolis qualified for the playoffs three times. They lost in the semifinals in 1953, lost the 1954 finals, and won the American Association championship in 1956. On the heels of a 92–62 campaign, manager Kerby Farrell's Indians defeated Minneapolis, 4–3, in the semifinals before winning their sixth AA title over the Denver Bears, 4–0. They capped off the season by sweeping Rochester, 4–0, to win the Junior World Series.

Having incurred significant financial losses, Cleveland elected to sell the team after the 1955 season. The Indianapolis community rallied to save the Indians by purchasing 20,182 shares of stock valued at $10 each, which allowed Indians, Inc., to purchase the club in December. The affiliation between the major and minor league Indians remained intact until the teams parted ways after the 1956 season.

Indianapolis held a three-year affiliation with the Chicago White Sox from 1957 to 1959, with their only winning season occurring in the final season. This was followed by even shorter stints as the Triple-A affiliate of the Philadelphia Phillies in 1960 and the Cincinnati Reds in 1961. The 1961 team qualified for the playoffs but were ousted in the semifinals. The Indians rejoined the Chicago White Sox organization in 1962 and experienced another semifinal playoff exit in the first year of the affiliation. The American Association disbanded after the 1962 season.

=== International League (1963) ===
The Indians became members of the Triple-A International League (IL) in 1963 and retained their affiliation with the White Sox. Led by Rollie Hemsley, the 1963 Indians clinched the Southern Division title with an 86–67 record. They defeated the Syracuse Chiefs, 4–1, in the playoff semifinals before winning the International League championship over the Atlanta Crackers, 4–2. With the addition of Indianapolis and the Little Rock Travelers to the IL, the westernmost teams in the loop, team travel costs increased. At the 1963 Winter Meetings, major league teams refused to continue paying to defray these additional costs, so Indianapolis and Little Rock were expelled from the league.

=== Pacific Coast League (1964–1968) ===
The Pacific Coast League welcomed Indianapolis and Little Rock as members in 1964. Though they became the easternmost teams in the league, its two-division alignment helped to keep travel costs down. The Indians continued to serve as the top farm club of the Chicago White Sox through 1967, but they were unable to return to the postseason during the affiliation. They became part of the Cincinnati Reds' organization for a third time in 1968.

=== American Association (1969–1997) ===
The American Association was revived in 1969, and the Indians rejoined the league as the Triple-A affiliate of the Cincinnati Reds. Through 1982, the team qualified for the AA playoffs on three occasions via winning Eastern Division titles. They lost the 1971 league title in a best-of-seven series to the Denver Bears, 4–3. The 1974 championship series also went the full seven games with Indianapolis losing to the Tulsa Oilers. The 1978 team was denied a championship, losing to the Omaha Royals, 4–1. George Scherger managed the 1982 Indians to a fourth Eastern Division title as a Reds affiliate with a 75–61 campaign. They then defeated Omaha, 4–2, for the AA championship.

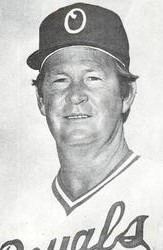
Joe Sparks led the Indians to win three consecutive American Association championships from 1986 to 1988.

Indianapolis became part of the Montreal Expos organization in 1984 in what would become one of the most successful periods in team history. Though they were eliminated in the semifinals in 1984, the Indians won four consecutive American Association championships from 1986 to 1989. Manager Joe Sparks was at the helm for the first three of these titles. The 1986 Indians won the division with an 80–62 record. They won the AA championship versus the Denver Zephyrs, 4–3. The 1987 team placed second in the division, which gave them for a playoff berth. They beat the Louisville Redbirds, 3–2, in the semifinals and then won another league championship over Denver, 4–1. Sparks led the 1988 Indians to the Eastern Division title on a 89–53 season. In a single round of playoffs, they defeated Omaha, 3–1, for the league crown. From 1988 to 1991, American Association teams participated in interleague play with teams from the International League in a partnership called the Triple-A Alliance, and the season culminated in the Triple-A Classic, a best-of-seven postseason championship between the leagues' champions. Indianapolis won the first of these against Rochester, 4–2. Manager Tom Runnells' 1989 team ended the season with an 87–59 record and the Eastern Division title. They defeated Omaha, 3–2, for their fourth consecutive American Association championship. In the Triple-A Classic, the Indians swept the Richmond Braves, 4–0.

Indianapolis affiliated with Cincinnati for the fourth time in 1993. In 1994, Marc Bombard managed the team to a first-place 86–57 mark. They won the semifinals over Louisville, 3–0, and bested the Nashville Sounds, 3–1, for another league championship. The Indians made return trips to the postseason over the next three years but suffered semifinal eliminations in 1995 and 1997 and a finals loss in 1996. After 66 seasons at Bush Stadium, the Indians left the ballpark for the new $20-million Victory Field in downtown Indianapolis' White River State Park on July 11, 1996.

=== International League (1998–present) ===
The American Association disbanded after the 1997 season, and its teams were absorbed by the two remaining Triple-A leagues—the International League (IL) and Pacific Coast League. Indianapolis returned to the IL, of which they had previously been members in 1963. They remained as affiliates of the Cincinnati Reds through 1999.

In 2000, the team entered into a new partnership with the Milwaukee Brewers. Steve Smith led the 2000 Indians to the Western Division title with an 81–63 record. They defeated the Durham Bulls, 3–2, in the semifinals before winning the International League championship versus the Scranton/Wilkes-Barre Red Barons, 3–2. The Indians met the Memphis Redbirds, champions of the Pacific Coast League in the Triple-A World Series, winning 3–1. Sub-.500 finishes during the next four seasons kept the team from returning to the postseason as a Brewers affiliate and prompted the team to end their affiliation with Milwaukee.

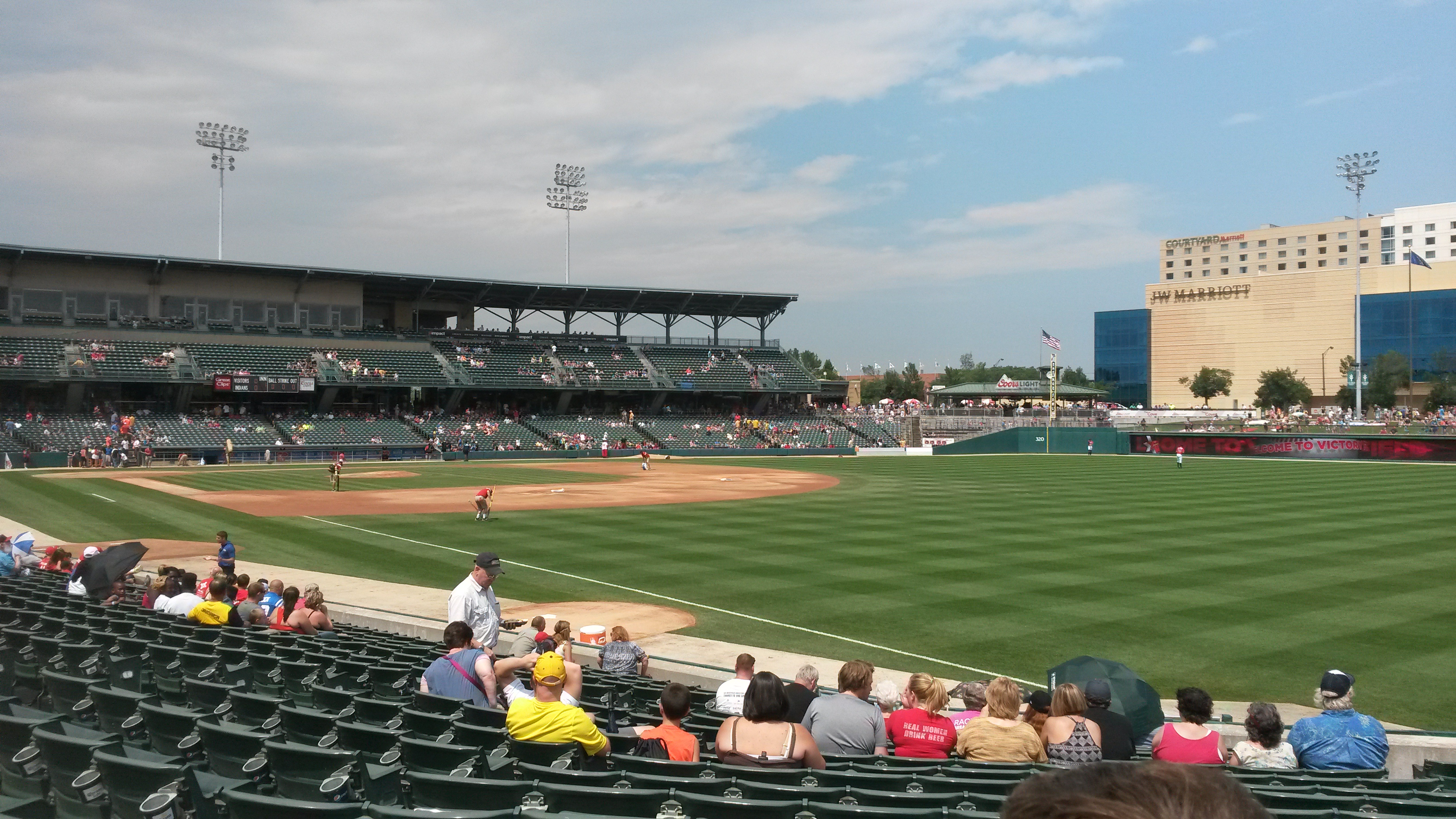
The Indians have played at Victory Field since 1996.

The Indians became the Triple-A affiliate of the Pittsburgh Pirates in 2005 after having previously been in their farm system in 1951. They qualified for the IL playoffs with a wild card berth, advanced to the finals by defeating the Buffalo Bisons, 3–2, but lost the championship to the Toledo Mud Hens, 3–0. the 2016 team finished the season tied for first-place in the Western Division with Toledo. On September 5, the Indians lost a one-game playoff against the Mud Hens for the division title, 4–0, which eliminated them from postseason contention. Indianapolis won back-to-back Western Division titles in 2012 and 2013 but lost in the semifinal round each time.

At the end of the 2015 season, Indianapolis was tied with the Columbus Clippers for first. Per the league's playoff procedures, the teams were declared co-champions of the Western Division, and the Indians lost the tiebreaker to be seeded as the wild card team. The won their semifinals series against the Scranton/Wilkes-Barre RailRiders, 3–0, but lost the IL title versus Columbus Clippers, 3–2. They returned to the postseason in 2017 as Western Division champions but were eliminated in the semifinals by Durham, 3–1. The Indians did not qualify for the postseason from 2018 to 2019. The start of the 2020 season was initially postponed due to the COVID-19 pandemic before being cancelled altogether.

In conjunction with Major League Baseball's restructuring of Minor League Baseball in 2021, the Indians were placed in the Triple-A East. They also extended their Professional Development License with Pittsburgh through 2030. No playoffs were held to determine a league champion; instead, the team with the best regular-season record was declared the winner. Indianapolis ended the season in 11th place with a 57–62 record. However, 10 games that had been postponed from the start of the season were reinserted into the schedule as a postseason tournament called the Triple-A Final Stretch in which all 30 Triple-A clubs competed for the highest winning percentage. Indianapolis finished the tournament tied for 18th place with a 4–5 record. In 2022, the Triple-A East became known as the International League, the name historically used by the regional circuit prior to the 2021 reorganization. After the 2025 season, the Indians unveiled a new logo set, marking their first logo change since 1996, when they still played in the American Association. These logos include American Indian alternate logos.

== Season-by-season records ==
Key
League	The team's final position in the league standings
Division	The team's final position in the divisional standings
GB	Games behind the team that finished in first place in the division that season
‡	Class champions (1904–present)
†	League champions (1902–present)
*	Division champions (1959–2022)
^	Postseason berth (1933–present)

Season-by-season records
Season	League	Regular-season					Postseason			MLB affiliate	Ref.
Season	League	Record	Win %	League	Division	GB	Record	Win %	Result	MLB affiliate	Ref.
1902 †	AA	96–45	.681	1st	—	—	—	—	Result	Won AA championship	Unaffiliated
1903	AA	78–61	.561	4th	—	12 1/2	—	—	—	Unaffiliated	
1904	AA	69–85	.448	6th	—	29 1/2	—	—	—	Unaffiliated	
1905	AA	69–83	.454	6th	—	31	—	—	—	Unaffiliated	
1906	AA	53–96	.356	8th	—	38 1/2	—	—	—	Unaffiliated	
1907	AA	73–80	.477	6th	—	16 1/2	—	—	—	Unaffiliated	
1908 †	AA	92–61	.601	1st	—	—	—	—	Won AA championship	Unaffiliated	
1909	AA	83–85	.494	4th	—	10	—	—	—	Unaffiliated	
1910	AA	69–96	.418	7th	—	36 1/2	—	—	—	Unaffiliated	
1911	AA	78–88	.470	7th	—	21 1/2	—	—	—	Unaffiliated	
1912	AA	56–111	.335	8th	—	50	—	—	—	Unaffiliated	
1913	AA	68–99	.407	8th	—	32	—	—	—	Unaffiliated	
1914	AA	88–77	.533	3rd	—	9 1/2	—	—	—	Unaffiliated	
1915	AA	81–70	.536	3rd	—	9 1/2	—	—	—	Unaffiliated	
1916	AA	95–71	.572	2nd	—	5 1/2	—	—	—	Unaffiliated	
1917 † ‡	AA	90–63	.588	1st	—	—	4–1	.800	Won AA championship Won Little World Series vs. Toronto Maple Leafs, 4–1	Unaffiliated	
1918 (Note: The 1918 season was suspended after the games of July 21 as team owners voted to end the season in response to the "work or fight" order issued by Secretary of War Newton D. Baker to aid the effort to win World War I.)	AA	41–34	.547	3rd	—	3	—	—	—	Unaffiliated	
1919	AA	85–68	.556	4th	—	8 1/2	—	—	—	Unaffiliated	
1920	AA	83–83	.500	5th	—	33	—	—	—	Unaffiliated	
1921	AA	83–85	.494	4th	—	15	—	—	—	Unaffiliated	
1922	AA	87–80	.521	4th	—	20	—	—	—	Unaffiliated	
1923	AA	72–94	.434	7th	—	40	—	—	—	Unaffiliated	
1924	AA	92–74	.554	2nd	—	4	—	—	—	Unaffiliated	
1925	AA	92–74	.554	2nd	—	13 1/2	—	—	—	Unaffiliated	
1926	AA	94–71	.570	2nd	—	10	—	—	—	Unaffiliated	
1927	AA	70–98	.417	6th	—	31	—	—	—	Unaffiliated	
1928 † ‡	AA	99–68	.593	1st	—	—	5–1	.833	Won AA championship Won Little World Series vs. Rochester Red Wings, 5–1	Unaffiliated	
1929	AA	78–89	.467	4th	—	33	—	—	—	Unaffiliated	
1930	AA	60–93	.392	8th	—	33	—	—	—	Unaffiliated	
1931	AA	86–80	.518	3rd	—	17 1/2	—	—	—	Unaffiliated	
1932	AA	86–80	.518	5th	—	13	—	—	—	Unaffiliated	
1933	AA	82–72	.532	6th	—	20	—	—	—	Unaffiliated	
1934	AA	77–75	.507	5th	—	9 1/2	—	—	—	Unaffiliated	
1935	AA	85–67	.559	2nd	—	5	—	—	—	Unaffiliated	
1936^	AA	79–75	.513	4th	—	11	5–5	.500	Won semifinals vs. St. Paul Saints, 4–1; Lost AA championship vs. Milwaukee Brewers, 4–1	Unaffiliated	
1937	AA	67–85	.441	6th	—	22	—	—	—	Unaffiliated	
1938^	AA	80–74	.519	4th	—	11 1/2	2–4	.333	Lost semifinals vs. Kansas City Blues, 4–2	Unaffiliated	
1939^	AA	82–72	.532	3rd	—	25	5–5	.500	Won semifinals vs. Kansas City Blues, 4–1; Lost AA championship vs. Louisville Colonels, 4–1	Cincinnati Reds	
1940	AA	62–84	.425	6th	—	30	—	—	—	Cincinnati Reds	
1941	AA	65–88	.425	6th	—	30	—	—	—	Cincinnati Reds	
1942	AA	76–78	.494	6th (tie)	—	8 1/2	—	—	—	Unaffiliated	
1943^	AA	85–67	.559	2nd	—	5 1/2	3–5	.375	Won semifinals vs. Toledo Mud Hens, 3–2; Lost AA championship vs. Columbus Red Birds, 3–0	Unaffiliated	
1944	AA	57–93	.380	6th	—	43 1/2	—	—	—	Unaffiliated	
1945^	AA	90–63	.588	2nd	—	2 1/2	2–4	.333	Lost semifinals vs. St. Paul Saints, 4–2	Unaffiliated	
1946^	AA	88–65	.575	2nd	—	4	4–7	.364	Won semifinals vs. Minneapolis Millers, 4–3; Lost AA championship vs. Louisville Colonels, 4–0	Boston Braves	
1947	AA	74–79	.484	6th	—	19	—	—	—	Pittsburgh Pirates	
1948^	AA	100–54	.649	1st	—	—	2–4	.333	Lost semifinals vs. St. Paul Saints, 4–2	Pittsburgh Pirates	
1949^ † ‡	AA	93–61	.604	2nd	—	1/2	12–8	.600	Won semifinals vs. Minneapolis Millers, 4–3; Won AA championship vs. Milwaukee Brewers, 4–3; Won Junior World Series vs. Montreal Royals, 4–2	Pittsburgh Pirates	
1950^	AA	85–67	.575	2nd	—	4	7–4	.636	Won semifinals vs. St. Paul Saints, 4–0; Lost AA championship vs. Columbus Red Birds, 4–3	Pittsburgh Pirates	
1951	AA	68–84	.447	7th	—	26 1/2	—	—	—	Pittsburgh Pirates	
1952	AA	75–79	.487	6th	—	26	—	—	—	Cleveland Indians	
1953^	AA	82–72	.532	4th	—	8	2–4	.333	Lost semifinals vs. Kansas City Blues, 4–2	Cleveland Indians	
1954^	AA	95–57	.625	1st	—	—	5–6	.455	Won semifinals vs. Minneapolis Millers, 4–2; Lost AA championship vs. Louisville Colonels, 4–1	Cleveland Indians	
1955	AA	67–86	.438	7th	—	24 1/2	—	—	—	Cleveland Indians	
1956^ † ‡	AA	92–62	.597	1st	—	—	12–3	.800	Won semifinals vs. Minneapolis Millers, 4–3; Won AA championship vs. Denver Bears, 4–0; Won Junior World Series vs. Rochester Red Wings, 4–0	Cleveland Indians	
1957	AA	74–80	.481	6th	—	19	—	—	—	Chicago White Sox	
1958	AA	72–82	.468	6th	—	18 1/2	—	—	—	Chicago White Sox	
1959	AA	86–76	.531	3rd	3rd	11	—	—	—	Chicago White Sox	
1960	AA	65–89	.422	7th	—	23	—	—	—	Philadelphia Phillies	
1961^	AA	86–64	.573	1st	—	—	1–4	.200	Lost semifinals vs. Houston Buffs, 4–1	Cincinnati Reds	
1962^	AA	89–58	.605	1st	—	—	0–3	.000	Lost semifinals vs. Louisville Colonels, 3–0	Chicago White Sox	
1963 * †	IL	86–67	.562	1st	1st	—	8–3	.727	Won Southern Division title Won semifinals vs. Syracuse Chiefs, 4–1; Won IL championship vs. Atlanta Crackers, 4–2	Chicago White Sox	
1964	PCL	89–69	.563	4th	2nd	7	—	—	—	Chicago White Sox	
1965	PCL	70–78	.473	8th (tie)	3rd (tie)	22 1/2	—	—	—	Chicago White Sox	
1966	PCL	80–68	.541	4th	3rd	5 1/2	—	—	—	Chicago White Sox	
1967	PCL	76–71	.517	5th	2nd	8 1/2	—	—	—	Chicago White Sox	
1968	PCL	66–78	.458	8th	5th	27	—	—	—	Cincinnati Reds	
1969	AA	74–66	.529	3rd	—	11	—	—	—	Cincinnati Reds	
1970	AA	71–69	.507	2nd	2nd	3	—	—	—	Cincinnati Reds	
1971 *	AA	84–55	.604	1st	1st	—	3–4	.429	Won Eastern Division title Lost AA championship vs. Denver Bears, 4–3	Cincinnati Reds	.
1972	AA	61–79	.436	6th	4th	22	—	—	—	Cincinnati Reds	
1973	AA	74–62	.544	2nd	2nd	9	—	—	—	Cincinnati Reds	
1974 *	AA	78–57	.578	1st	1st	—	3–4	.429	Won Eastern Division title Lost AA championship vs. Tulsa Oilers, 4–3	Cincinnati Reds	
1975	AA	71–64	.526	4th	2nd	5 1/2	—	—	—	Cincinnati Reds	
1976	AA	62–73	.459	6th	3rd	15 1/2	—	—	—	Cincinnati Reds	
1977	AA	72–64	.529	2nd	2nd	4 1/2	—	—	—	Cincinnati Reds	
1978 *	AA	78–57	.578	1st	1st	—	1–4	.200	Won Eastern Division title Lost AA championship vs. Omaha Royals, 4–1	Cincinnati Reds	
1979	AA	67–69	.493	5th	4th	11	—	—	—	Cincinnati Reds	
1980	AA	58–77	.430	8th	4th	16 1/2	—	—	—	Cincinnati Reds	
1981	AA	62–74	.456	7th	3rd	11	—	—	—	Cincinnati Reds	
1982 * †	AA	75–61	.551	1st	1st	—	4–2	.667	Won Eastern Division title Won AA championship vs. Omaha Royals, 4–2	Cincinnati Reds	
1983	AA	64–72	.471	6th (tie)	3rd	14 1/2	—	—	—	Cincinnati Reds	
1984^	AA	91–63	.591	1st	—	—	2–4	.333	Lost semifinals vs. Louisville Redbirds, 4–2	Montreal Expos	
1985	AA	61–81	.430	8th	4th	13	—	—	—	Montreal Expos	
1986 * †	AA	80–62	.563	1st	1st	—	4–3	.571	Won Eastern Division title Won AA championship vs. Denver Zephyrs, 4–3	Montreal Expos	
1987^ †	AA	74–64	.536	3rd	—	4	7–3	.700	Won semifinals vs. Louisville Redbirds, 3–2; Won AA championship vs. Denver Zephyrs, 4–1	Montreal Expos	
1988 * † ‡	AA	89–53	.627	1st	1st	—	7–3	.700	Won Eastern Division title Won AA championship vs. Omaha Royals, 3–1; Won Triple-A Classic vs. Rochester Red Wings, 4–2	Montreal Expos	
1989 * † ‡	AA	87–59	.596	1st	1st	—	7–2	.778	Won Eastern Division title Won AA championship vs. Omaha Royals, 3–2; Won Triple-A Classic vs. Richmond Braves, 4–0	Montreal Expos	
1990	AA	61–85	.418	7th	4th	24 1/2	—	—	—	Montreal Expos	
1991	AA	75–68	.524	4th	2nd	6	—	—	—	Montreal Expos	
1992	AA	83–61	.576	2nd	2nd	4	—	—	—	Montreal Expos	
1993	AA	66–77	.462	7th	4th	15	—	—	—	Cincinnati Reds	
1994^ †	AA	86–57	.601	1st	—	—	6–1	.857	Won semifinals vs. Louisville Redbirds, 3–0; Won AA championship vs. Nashville Sounds, 3–1	Cincinnati Reds	
1995^	AA	88–56	.611	1st	—	—	0–3	.000	Lost semifinals vs. Louisville Redbirds, 3–0	Cincinnati Reds	
1996^	AA	78–66	.542	3rd	2nd	6	4–5	.444	Won semifinals vs. Buffalo Bisons, 3–2; Lost AA championship vs. Oklahoma City 89ers, 3–1	Cincinnati Reds	
1997^	AA	85–59	.590	2nd	2nd	2	2–3	.400	Lost semifinals vs. Buffalo Bisons, 3–2	Cincinnati Reds	
1998	IL	76–67	.531	6th	2nd	1/2	—	—	—	Cincinnati Reds	
1999	IL	75–69	.521	7th	2nd	9 1/2	—	—	—	Cincinnati Reds	
2000 * † ‡	IL	81–63	.563	5th	1st	—	9–5	.643	Won Western Division title Won semifinals vs. Durham Bulls, 3–2; Won IL championship vs. Scranton/Wilkes-Barre Red Barons, 3–2; Won Triple-A World Series vs. Memphis Redbirds, 3–1	Milwaukee Brewers	
2001	IL	66–78	.458	11th	3rd	18	—	—	—	Milwaukee Brewers	
2002	IL	67–76	.469	9th	3rd	13 1/2	—	—	—	Milwaukee Brewers	
2003	IL	64–78	.451	12th	4th	14 1/2	—	—	—	Milwaukee Brewers	
2004	IL	66–78	.458	11th (tie)	3rd	14	—	—	—	Milwaukee Brewers	
2005^	IL	78–66	.542	4th	2nd	11	3–5	.375	Won wild card berth Won semifinals vs. Buffalo Bisons, 3–2; Lost IL championship vs. Toledo Mud Hens, 3–0	Pittsburgh Pirates	
2006^	IL	76–66	.535	4th (tie)	1st (tie)	—	0–1	.000	Lost Western Division title vs. Toledo Mud Hens, 1–0 (Note: Indianapolis finished the 2006 season tied for first with the Toledo Mud Hens. On September 5, Indianapolis lost a one-game playoff against Toledo for the Western Division title, 4–0.)	Pittsburgh Pirates	
2007	IL	70–73	.490	8th	3rd	12	—	—	—	Pittsburgh Pirates	
2008	IL	68–76	.472	9th	4th	20	—	—	—	Pittsburgh Pirates	
2009	IL	70–73	.490	9th	3rd	14 1/2	—	—	—	Pittsburgh Pirates	
2010	IL	71–73	.493	8th	3rd	8 1/2	—	—	—	Pittsburgh Pirates	
2011	IL	76–68	.528	6th	2nd	12	—	—	—	Pittsburgh Pirates	
2012 *	IL	89–55	.618	1st	1st	—	1–3	.250	Won Western Division title Lost semifinals vs. Charlotte Knights, 3–1	Pittsburgh Pirates	
2013 *	IL	80–64	.556	3rd	1st	—	0–3	.000	Won Western Division title Lost semifinals vs. Durham Bulls, 3–0	Pittsburgh Pirates	
2014	IL	73–71	.507	7th	2nd	6	—	—	—	Pittsburgh Pirates	
2015 *	IL	83–61	.576	1st (tie)	1st (tie)	—	5–3	.625	Won Western Division title (Note: Indianapolis finished the 2015 season tied for first with the Columbus Clippers. Per the International League's playoff procedures, the teams were declared co-champions of the Western Division, and the Indians lost the tiebreaker to be seeded as the wild card team.); Won semifinals vs. Scranton/Wilkes-Barre RailRiders, 3–0; Lost IL championship vs. Columbus Clippers, 3–2	Pittsburgh Pirates	
2016	IL	70–74	.486	7th	3rd	12	—	—	—	Pittsburgh Pirates	
2017 *	IL	79–63	.556	5th	1st	—	1–3	.250	Won Western Division title Lost semifinals vs. Durham Bulls, 3–1	Pittsburgh Pirates	
2018	IL	73–67	.521	5th (tie)	2nd (tie)	1/2	—	—	—	Pittsburgh Pirates	
2019	IL	66–74	.471	9th (tie)	2nd (tie)	15	—	—	—	Pittsburgh Pirates	
2020	IL	Season cancelled (COVID-19 pandemic)								Pittsburgh Pirates	
2021	AAAE	61–67 (Note: In 2021, the team with the best record at the end of the regular-season was declared the Triple-A East champion. Indianapolis had a 57–62 (.479) record, 19 1/2 games behind first place, which put them 11th in the league and 4th in their division. The regular-season was followed by the Triple-A Final Stretch, a 10-game postseason tournament in which all 30 Triple-A clubs competed for the highest winning percentage. Indianapolis finished the tournament tied for 18th place with a 4–5 (.444) record.)	.477	11th (tie)	4th	12	—	—	—	Pittsburgh Pirates	
2022	IL	74–75	.497	10th (tie)	4th (tie)	17	—	—	—	Pittsburgh Pirates	
2023	IL	70–78	.473	12th (tie)	6th (tie)	14	—	—	—	Pittsburgh Pirates	
2024	IL	77–70	.524	6th	4th	11 1/2	—	—	—	Pittsburgh Pirates	
2025	IL	87–62	.584	4th	1st	—	—	—	—	Pittsburgh Pirates	
2026	IL	75–75	.500	11th (tie)	6th (tie)	8	—	—	—	Pittsburgh Pirates	
Totals	—	9,507–8,942	.515	—	—	—	148–135	.523	—	—	—

== Roster ==
Indianapolis Indians roster
Players	Coaches/Other
Pitchers: 12 Hunter Barco *; 25 Beau Burrows; 6 Michael Darrell-Hicks; 54 Noah Davis; 50 Derek Diamond; 44 Nick Dombkowski; 40 Thomas Harrington *; 46 Justin Meis; 36 Noah Murdock *; 39 Brandon Neeck; 19 Cy Nielson; 29 C. D. Pelham; 53 Evan Sisk *; 41 Landon Tomkins; 33 Connor Wietgrefe; Catchers: 8 Cameron Barstad ~; 31 Derek Berg; 44 Christian Bethancourt *; 20 Nick Cimillo; 56 Jose Herrera * ~; Infielders: 4 Jack Brannigan *; 2 Jesus Castillo; 46 Duce Gourson; 11 Mitch Jebb; 59 Grae Kessinger; 47 Enmanuel Valdez; 38 Nick Yorke *; Outfielders: 7 Tyler Callihan *; 34 Jhostynxon Garcia *; 17 Robert Hassell III; 16 Mike Jarvis; 5 Joshua Palacios ~; 41 Johnathan Rodríguez *	Manager: 18 Eric Patterson; Coaches: 15 Drew Benes (pitching); 51 Nasusel Cabrera (pitching); 37 JD Closser (catching); 28 Casey Harms (hitting); 38 Eric Munson (hitting); 48 Joe Thatcher (coach); 60-day injured list: -- Kyler Fedko * (full season); -- Ryan Harbin; 2 Termarr Johnson (full season); 7-day injured list; * On Pittsburgh Pirates 40-man roster; ~ Development list; # Rehab assignment; ∞ Reserve list; ‡ Restricted list; § Suspended list; † Temporarily inactive list; Roster updated September 18, 2026; Transactions; → More rosters: MiLB • International League; → Pittsburgh Pirates minor league players

== Achievements ==
=== Awards ===
The franchise has been awarded these honors by Minor League Baseball.

Minor League Baseball awards
Award	Season	Ref.
John H. Johnson President's Award	1988	

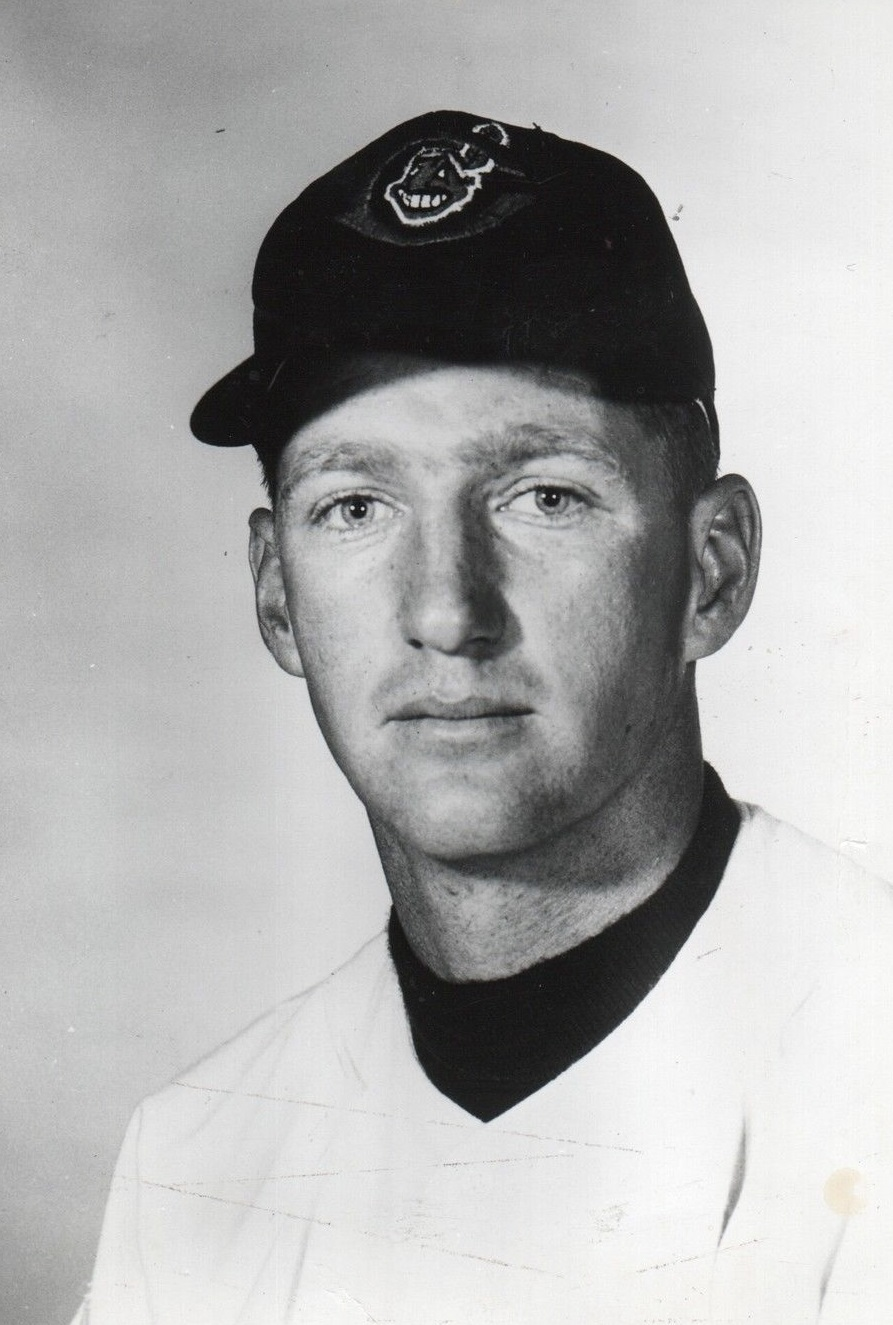
Herb Score was selected as the 1954 AA Most Valuable Player and Rookie of the Year.

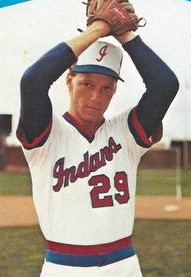
Joe Hesketh won the 1984 AA Most Valuable Pitcher Award.

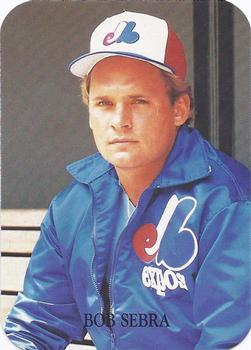
Bob Sebra was chosen as the 1988 AA Most Valuable Pitcher.

Eighteen players and nine managers won league awards in recognition for their performance with Indianapolis in the American Association.

American Association awards
Award	Recipient	Season	Ref.
Most Valuable Player	Stew Hofferth	1943	
Most Valuable Player	Stan Wentzel	1945	
Most Valuable Player	Les Fleming	1948	
Most Valuable Player	Nanny Fernandez	1949	
Most Valuable Player	Herb Score	1954	
Most Valuable Player	Cliff Cook	1961	
Most Valuable Player	Bernie Carbo	1969	
Most Valuable Player	Champ Summers	1978	
Most Valuable Player	Eric Owens	1995	
Most Valuable Pitcher	Joe Hesketh	1984	
Most Valuable Pitcher	Pascual Pérez	1987	
Most Valuable Pitcher	Bob Sebra	1988	
Most Valuable Pitcher	Mark Gardner	1989	
Rookie of the Year	Herb Score	1954	
Rookie of the Year	Cam Carreon	1959	
Rookie of the Year	Chico Ruiz	1961	
Rookie of the Year	Ken Griffey Sr.	1973	
Rookie of the Year	Andrés Galarraga	1985	
Rookie of the Year	Willie Greene	1993	
Rookie of the Year	Eric Owens	1995	
Manager of the Year	Kerby Farrell	1954	
Manager of the Year	Kerby Farrell	1956	
Manager of the Year	Cot Deal	1961	
Manager of the Year	Luke Appling	1962	
Manager of the Year	Vern Rapp	1971	
Manager of the Year	Vern Rapp	1974	
Manager of the Year	Buck Rogers	1984	
Manager of the Year	Joe Sparks	1986	
Manager of the Year	Joe Sparks	1987	
Manager of the Year	Joe Sparks	1988	
Manager of the Year	Tom Runnells	1989	
Manager of the Year	Marc Bombard	1994	
Manager of the Year	Marc Bombard	1995	
Manager of the Year	Dave Miley	1997	

One player won a league award in recognition for his performance with Indianapolis in the Pacific Coast League.

Pacific Coast League awards
Award	Recipient	Season	Ref.
Most Valuable Player	Duane Josephson	1966	

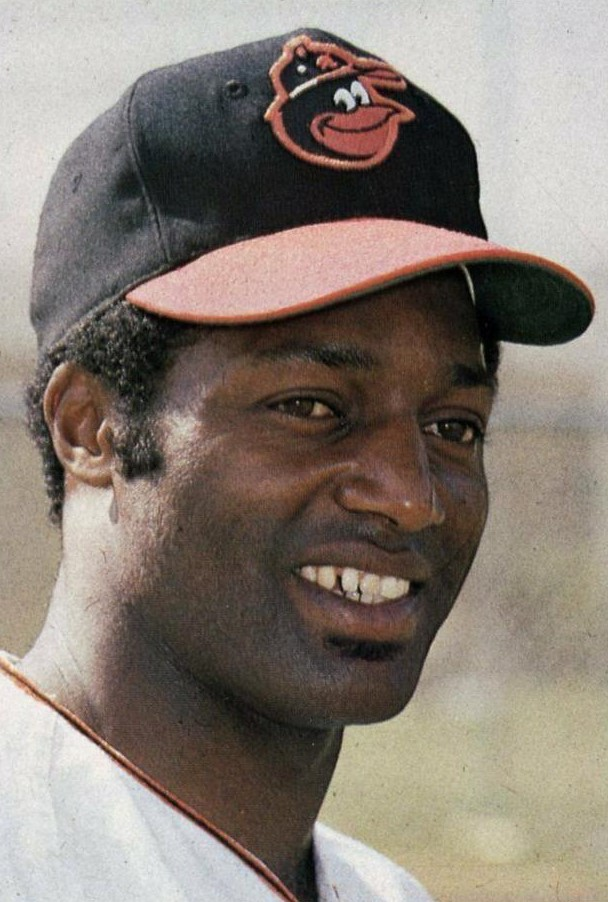
Don Buford won the IL Most Valuable Player Award and Rookie of the Year Award in 1963.

Seven players have won league awards in recognition for their performance with Indianapolis in the International League.

International League awards
Award	Recipient	Season	Ref.
Most Valuable Player	Don Buford	1963	
Most Valuable Player	Roberto Petagine	1998	
Most Valuable Pitcher	Fritz Ackley	1963	
Most Valuable Pitcher	Ben Hendrickson	2004	
Most Valuable Pitcher	Zach Duke	2005	
Most Valuable Pitcher	Steven Brault	2017	
Most Valuable Pitcher	Mitch Keller	2019	
Rookie of the Year	Don Buford	1963	

=== Hall of Famers ===
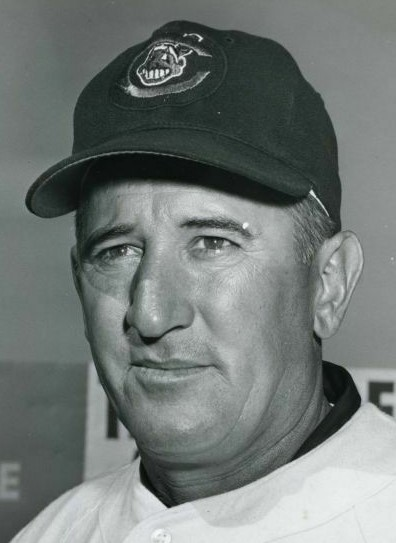
Al López, who played catcher on the 1948 Indians and managed the team from 1948 to 1950, was inducted into the National Baseball Hall of Fame in 1977.

Thirteen former Indians have been elected to the National Baseball Hall of Fame based on their performance in or contributions to Major League Baseball.

Hall of Famers
Name	Season(s)	Position	Inducted	Ref.
Luke Appling	1962	Manager	1964	
Mordecai Brown	1919	Pitcher	1949	
Gabby Hartnett	1942	Catcher / Manager	1955	
Randy Johnson	1988–1989	Pitcher	2015	
Harmon Killebrew	1958	Third baseman	1984	
Nap Lajoie	1918	First baseman / Manager	1937	
Al López	1948 / 1948–1950	Catcher / Manager	1977	
Rube Marquard	1908	Pitcher	1971	
Joe McCarthy	1911	Third baseman	1957	
Minnie Miñoso	1964	Outfielder	2022	
Ray Schalk	1938–1939	Manager	1955	
Bob Uecker (Ford C. Frick Award recipient)	1960	Catcher	2003	
Larry Walker	1989	Outfielder	2020	

== Radio and television ==
Howard Kellman is the long-standing "Voice of the Tribe", calling play-by-play for all but two seasons (1975 and 1980) since 1974. All Indians home and road games are broadcast on WNDE Fox Sports 1260 AM. Live audio broadcasts are also available online through the team's website and the MiLB First Pitch app. Some home games can be viewed on WTTV.2 The Dot, WISH-TV 8, and MyINDY-TV 23. All home and road games can be viewed through the MiLB.TV subscription feature of the official website of Minor League Baseball with WNDE's radio call synced to television.

== Name controversy ==
In July 2020, a year before Major League Baseball's similarly named Cleveland Indians changed their name to the "Guardians" in 2021 (which took effect in the 2022 MLB season), Indianapolis management said it would form a committee to determine whether a change was necessary, based on dialogue with local organizations and community members. By the time Cleveland changed their name in July 2021, Indianapolis announced that they had no immediate plans for a name change. Although they acknowledged that, when the team was initially formed, the name was a play on Indianapolis itself, the moniker had evolved to include more Native American references in their logo and marketing. Meanwhile, the primary newspaper covering the team, the Indianapolis Star, started to report stories and results about the team using only the city's name, without the supposedly controversial nickname. In addition, Carolina Castoreno-Santana, executive director of the American Indian Center of Indiana, said the Indianapolis Indians should change their name, arguing that the indigenous people were "overwhelmingly" in favor of changing the name. In February 2023, it was announced that the Indianapolis Indians would retain their long-held nickname and partner with local Indian tribes (the Miami Nation of Indiana). “We are grateful to the Indianapolis Indians for the opportunity to share our story with Hoosiers throughout central Indiana,” said Brian Buchanan, chief of the Miami Nation of Indians. “When the history of Indiana is studied, the major influence of Native American people is seen in the names of Indiana cities, state parks, rivers, food, celebrations and other cultural points of interest.”
