= American Association (1902–1997) Most Valuable Pitcher Award =

American Association Most Valuable Pitcher Award
- Sport: Baseball
- League: American Association
- Awarded for: Best regular-season pitcher in the American Association
- Country: United States
- Presented by: American Association

History
- First award: Sal Campisi (1969)
- Final award: Rick Helling (1996)

The American Association Most Valuable Pitcher Award was an annual award given to the best pitcher in Minor League Baseball's American Association based on their regular-season performance. Though the league was established in 1902, the award was not created until 1969. From 1929 to 1962, pitchers were eligible to win the Most Valuable Player Award (MVP). Eight pitchers won the MVP Award before the league disbanded after the 1962 season. The Most Valuable Pitcher Award was first issued starting with the league's revival in 1969, and it continued to be awarded through 1996; no winner was selected in the 1997 season, after which the circuit disbanded again.

Five players from the Denver Bears, Indianapolis Indians, and Oklahoma City 89ers were each selected for the Most Valuable Pitcher Award, more than any other teams in the league, followed by the Buffalo Bisons (4); the Iowa Cubs, Nashville Sounds, and Omaha Royals (2); and the Evansville Triplets, Louisville Redbirds, and Tulsa Oilers (1).

Six players from the Montreal Expos Major League Baseball (MLB) organization won the award, more than any other, followed by the Chicago White Sox organization (5); the Philadelphia Phillies organization (3); the Cincinnati Reds, Cleveland Indians, Kansas City Royals, Pittsburgh Pirates, St. Louis Cardinals, and Texas Rangers organizations (2); and the Chicago Cubs and Milwaukee Brewers organizations (1).

== Winners ==
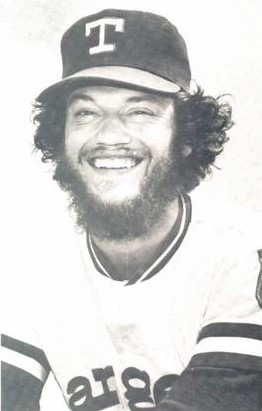
Jim Kern, the 1974 winner, won the American League Rolaids Relief Man Award in 1979.

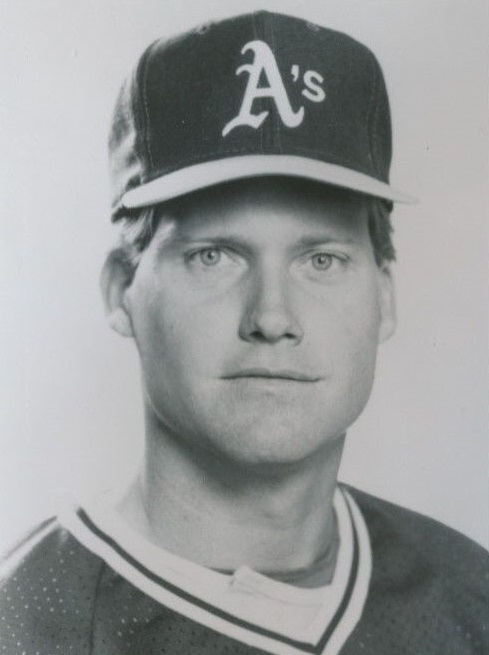
Jay Howell, the 1982 Most Valuable Pitcher, was selected to play in three Major League Baseball All-Star Games.

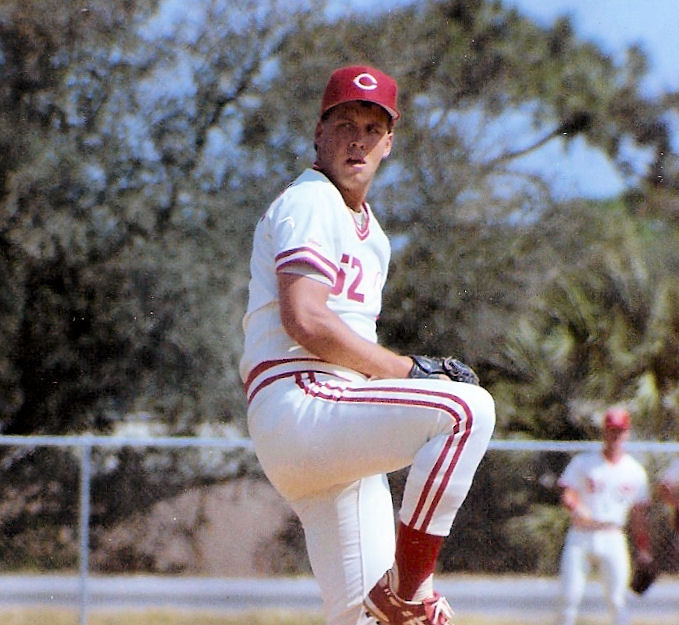
Chris Hammond was chosen for the award in 1990.

Key
| Record | The pitcher's win–loss record during the regular season |
| Saves | The number of saves earned by the pitcher, if any, during the regular season |
| ERA | The pitcher's earned run average (ERA) during the regular season |
| SO | The number of strikeouts recorded by the pitcher during the regular season |

Winners
| Year | Winner | Team | Organization | Record | Saves | ERA | SO | Ref. |
|---|---|---|---|---|---|---|---|---|
| 1969 | Sal Campisi | Tulsa Oilers | St. Louis Cardinals | 13–2 | 15 | 1.99 | 63 | |
| 1970 | Milt Wilcox | Indianapolis Indians | Cincinnati Reds | 12–10 | 0 | 2.84 | 110 | |
| 1971 | Garland Shifflett | Denver Bears | Washington Senators | 12–7 | 18 | 4.78 | 64 | |
| 1972 | Lloyd Gladden | Evansville Triplets | Milwaukee Brewers | 15–9 | 0 | 2.71 | 141 | |
| 1973 | Mark Littell | Omaha Royals | Kansas City Royals | 16–6 | 0 | 2.51 | 133 | |
| 1974 | Jim Kern | Oklahoma City 89ers | Cleveland Indians | 17–7 | 0 | 2.52 | 220 | |
| 1975 | Steve Dunning | Denver Bears | Chicago White Sox | 15–9 | 0 | 3.49 | 139 | |
| 1976 | John Montague | Oklahoma City 89ers | Philadelphia Phillies | 14–6 | 0 | 2.64 | 120 | |
| 1977 | Jim Wright | Oklahoma City 89ers | Philadelphia Phillies | 14–6 | 0 | 3.13 | 118 | |
| 1978 | Dan Warthen | Oklahoma City 89ers | Philadelphia Phillies | 13–8 | 0 | 4.09 | 144 | |
| 1979 | Dewey Robinson | Iowa Oaks | Chicago White Sox | 13–7 | 9 | 2.93 | 76 | |
| 1980 | Steve Ratzer | Denver Bears | Montreal Expos | 15–4 | 2 | 3.59 | 50 | |
| 1981 | Bryn Smith | Denver Bears | Montreal Expos | 15–5 | 1 | 3.05 | 127 | |
| 1982 | Jay Howell | Iowa Cubs | Chicago Cubs | 13–4 | 0 | 2.36 | 139 | |
| 1983 | Rich Barnes | Denver Bears | Chicago White Sox | 11–6 | 0 | 4.17 | 62 | |
| 1984 | Joe Hesketh | Indianapolis Indians | Montreal Expos | 12–3 | 0 | 3.05 | 135 | |
| 1985 | Mark Huismann | Omaha Royals | Kansas City Royals | 5–5 | 33 | 2.01 | 70 | |
| 1986 | Pete Filson | Buffalo Bisons | Chicago White Sox | 14–3 | 6 | 2.27 | 81 | |
| 1987 | Pascual Pérez | Indianapolis Indians | Montreal Expos | 9–7 | 0 | 3.79 | 125 | |
| 1988 | Bob Sebra | Indianapolis Indians | Montreal Expos | 12–6 | 0 | 2.94 | 126 | |
| 1989 | Mark Gardner | Indianapolis Indians | Montreal Expos | 12–4 | 0 | 2.37 | 175 | |
| 1990 | Chris Hammond | Nashville Sounds | Cincinnati Reds | 15–1 | 0 | 2.17 | 149 | |
| 1991 | Rick Reed | Buffalo Bisons | Pittsburgh Pirates | 14–4 | 0 | 2.15 | 102 | |
| 1992 | René Arocha | Louisville Redbirds | St. Louis Cardinals | 12–7 | 0 | 2.70 | 128 | |
| 1993 | Roy Smith | Buffalo Bisons | Pittsburgh Pirates | 15–11 | 0 | 4.13 | 87 | |
| 1994 | Scott Ruffcorn | Nashville Sounds | Chicago White Sox | 15–3 | 0 | 2.72 | 144 | |
| 1995 | Eric Bell | Buffalo Bisons | Cleveland Indians | 13–9 | 0 | 3.90 | 86 | |
| 1996 | Rick Helling | Oklahoma City 89ers | Texas Rangers | 12–4 | 0 | 2.96 | 157 | |
| 1997 | None selected | | | | | | | |

== Wins by team ==
| Team | Award(s) | Year(s) |
|---|---|---|
| Denver Bears | 5 | 1971, 1975, 1980, 1981, 1983 |
| Indianapolis Indians | 5 | 1970, 1984, 1987, 1988, 1989 |
| Oklahoma City 89ers | 5 | 1974, 1976, 1977, 1978, 1996 |
| Buffalo Bisons | 4 | 1986, 1991, 1993, 1995 |
| Iowa Cubs (Iowa Oaks) | 2 | 1979, 1982 |
| Nashville Sounds | 2 | 1990, 1994 |
| Omaha Royals | 2 | 1973, 1985 |
| Evansville Triplets | 1 | 1972 |
| Louisville Redbirds | 1 | 1992 |
| Tulsa Oilers | 1 | 1969 |

== Wins by organization ==
| Organization | Award(s) | Year(s) |
|---|---|---|
| Montreal Expos | 6 | 1980, 1981, 1984, 1987, 1988, 1989 |
| Chicago White Sox | 5 | 1975, 1979, 1983, 1986, 1994 |
| Philadelphia Phillies | 3 | 1976, 1977, 1978 |
| Cincinnati Reds | 2 | 1970, 1990 |
| Cleveland Indians | 2 | 1974, 1995 |
| Kansas City Royals | 2 | 1973, 1985 |
| Pittsburgh Pirates | 2 | 1991, 1993 |
| St. Louis Cardinals | 2 | 1969, 1992 |
| Texas Rangers (Washington Senators) | 2 | 1971, 1996 |
| Chicago Cubs | 1 | 1982 |
| Milwaukee Brewers | 1 | 1972 |
