= Toledo Sox =

Defunct minor-league professional baseball team

- 1953–1955; Toledo, Ohio

Minor league affiliations
- Previous classes: Triple-A (1953–1955)
- Previous leagues: American Association (1953–1955)

Major league affiliations
- Previous teams: Milwaukee Braves (1953–1955)

The Toledo Sox were a minor league baseball team based in Toledo, Ohio. They played in the American Association from 1953 to 1955 at the Triple-A level as an affiliate of the Milwaukee Braves.

== History ==
Entering the 1952 season, Toledo, Ohio, had been home to the Toledo Mud Hens for nearly every season since 1896. Mid-season in 1952, owner Danny Menendez moved the Mud Hens to Charleston, West Virginia, where they competed as the Charleston Senators through 1960.

Starting in 1953, Toledo fielded a replacement franchise in the American Association, the Toledo Sox, which was the former Milwaukee Brewers minor-league team. The Sox played in Toledo through the 1955 season. The first game the team played, in April 1953, was also the first game broadcast on radio by sports announcer Frankie Gilhooley, who went on to broadcast baseball games in Toledo through 2009. Sox manager George Selkirk was named the American Association Manager of the Year in 1953.

In 1956, the Sox moved to Wichita, Kansas, where they competed as the Wichita Braves through 1958. Toledo was without a minor-league team from 1956 through 1964; in 1965, a new Mud Hens team began playing in the Triple-A International League.

== Season records ==
Season	Manager(s)	W–L	Win %	Finish	Playoffs (games)	Ref.
1953	Tommy Holmes; George Selkirk	90–64	.584	1st of 8	defeated Louisville Colonels, 4–3 lost to Kansas City Blues, 4–3	
1954	George Selkirk	74–80	.481	6th of 8	did not qualify	
1955	George Selkirk	81–73	.526	5th of 8	did not qualify	

== See also ==
- Toledo Sox players
