= Brian Poldberg =

American baseball player

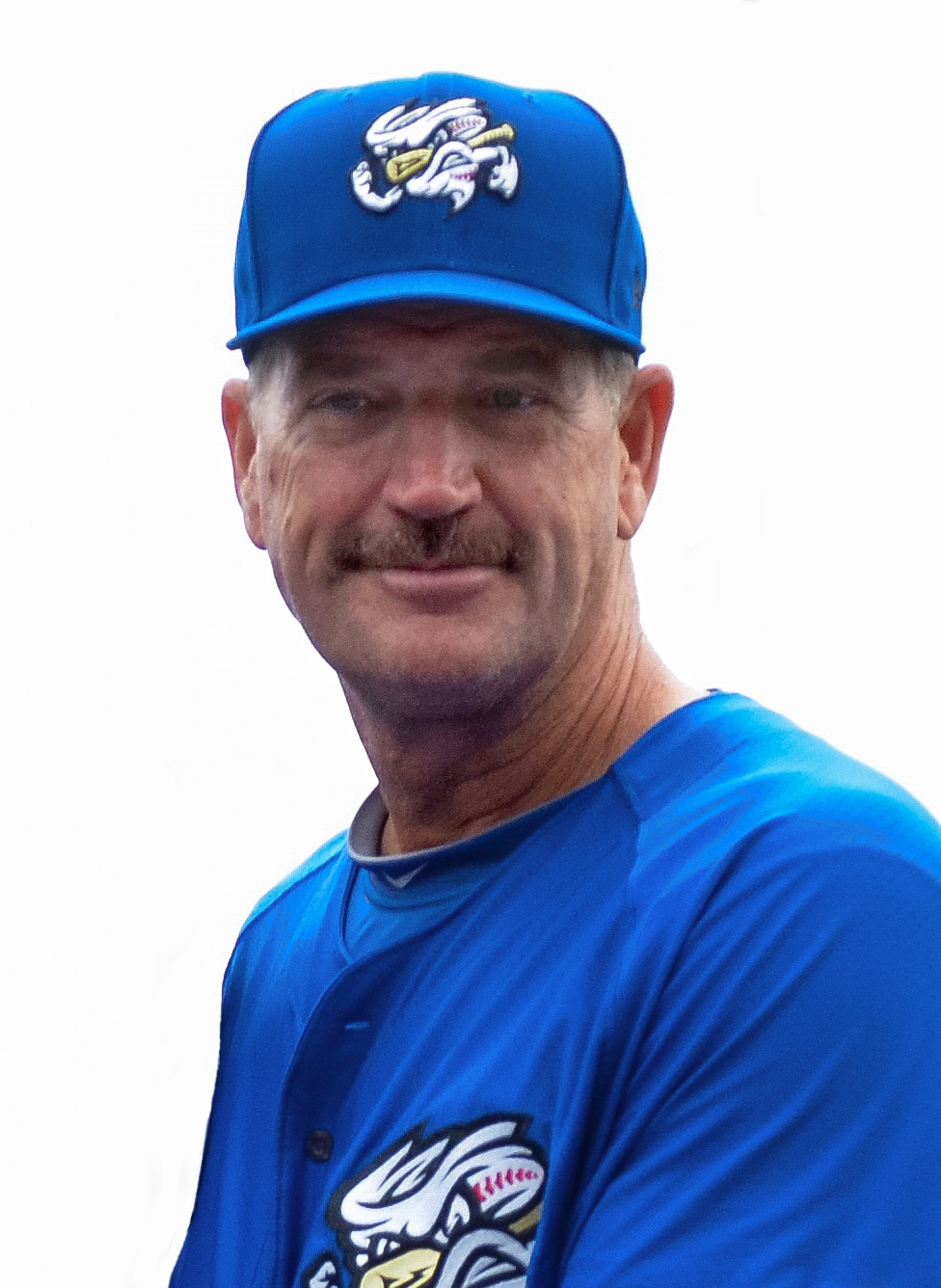
- Poldberg with the Omaha Storm Chasers in 2015
- Manager
- Born: May 16, 1957 (age 68); Omaha, Nebraska
- Bats: Right Throws: Right
- Stats at Baseball Reference

Teams
- As coach: Kansas City Royals (2004–2007); As manager: Northwest Arkansas Naturals (2008–2013); Omaha Storm Chasers (2014–2021)

Brian John Poldberg (born May 16, 1957) is a retired American professional baseball coach and manager. From 2014 to 2021, he managed the Omaha Storm Chasers, the Triple-A affiliate of the Kansas City Royals.

== Biography ==
Poldberg was born in Omaha, Nebraska. He played a total of six seasons in the New York Yankees and Kansas City Royals minor league systems, then began his coaching career in 1987. He has held several managing and coaching positions in the minor leagues. He is known for his exhaustive work with catchers. Poldberg resides in Carter Lake, Iowa, and he has spent 20 years with the Royals organization. From 2004 to 2007, Poldberg served in various coaching roles with the major league team. Before taking the position with Omaha, Poldberg was the manager for the Northwest Arkansas Naturals, the Double-A affiliate of the Royals, from 2008 to 2013. On September 23, 2021, Poldberg announced that he would retire at the end of the 2021 season.
