= Frankie Gilhooley =

American basketball player and minor league baseball announcer

Personal information
- Born: June 15, 1924 Toledo, Ohio, U.S.
- Died: November 19, 2010 (aged 86) Perrysburg, Ohio, U.S.
- Listed height: 5 ft 11 in (1.80 m)
- Listed weight: 180 lb (82 kg)

Career information
- High school: Central Catholic (Toledo, Ohio)
- College: Notre Dame (1943–1946)
- Position: Guard

Career history
- 1946–1947: Benton Harbor Gardner Bros
- 1947: Toledo Jeeps
- 1947–1953: Toledo Mercuries

Francis Patrick "Frankie" Gilhooley Jr. (June 15, 1924 – November 19, 2010) was an American professional basketball player and long-time minor league baseball announcer for the Toledo Mud Hens. He played for the Toledo Jeeps in the National Basketball League for eight games during the 1946–47 season. In college he played both baseball and basketball for the University of Notre Dame.

In 1953, Gilhooley began his broadcasting career as the radio voice of the Toledo Sox. Over the next 50+ years he held various roles in radio and television, at one point anchoring the evening sportscast segments on regional television. When the Mud Hens moved to their new facility in 2002, Fifth Third Field, the team named two concession areas, one on each concourse level, "Gilhooley's Grill." In addition to his baseball broadcasting career, Gilhooley also did play-by-play of Toledo and Bowling Green college basketball games.
