= Joe Sparks (coach) =

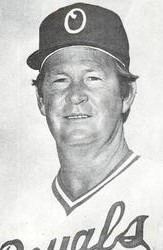
- Sparks in 1980
- Coach
- Born: March 15, 1938 (age 88); McComas, West Virginia, U.S.
- Bats: Left Throws: Right
- Stats at Baseball Reference

Teams
- Chicago White Sox (1979); Cincinnati Reds (1984); Montreal Expos (1989); New York Yankees (1990)

Joseph Everett Sparks (born March 15, 1938) is an American former professional baseball player, manager, coach and scout. A former infielder in the minor leagues, Sparks batted left-handed, threw right-handed, stood 6 feet (1.8 m) tall and weighed 195 pounds (88 kg) during his active career.

Sparks managed in minor league baseball for all or part of 20 seasons (1970–78; 1980–83; 1986–88; 1991–94) in the farm systems of the Chicago White Sox, Houston Astros, Cleveland Indians, Kansas City Royals, Montreal Expos and Detroit Tigers and compiled a career won/loss mark of 1,330–1,247 (.516). From 1986–88, he won three consecutive American Association championships while at the helm of the Indianapolis Indians, then Montreal's top affiliate. He also won the championship of the Class A Northern League in 1970, his maiden season as a manager.

Sparks served one-year coaching terms in Major League Baseball with the White Sox (1979), Cincinnati Reds (1984), Expos (1989) and New York Yankees (1990), and was an advance scout for the St. Louis Cardinals for eight seasons (1996–2003). He then served in the same role for the Oakland Athletics.

His son, Greg, a former minor league first baseman, manager and hitting instructor in the Athletics' minor league system, has been the assistant MLB hitting coach of Joe Sparks' former longtime employer, the White Sox, since 2016.
