= List of Nashville Sounds awards, All-Stars, and league leaders =

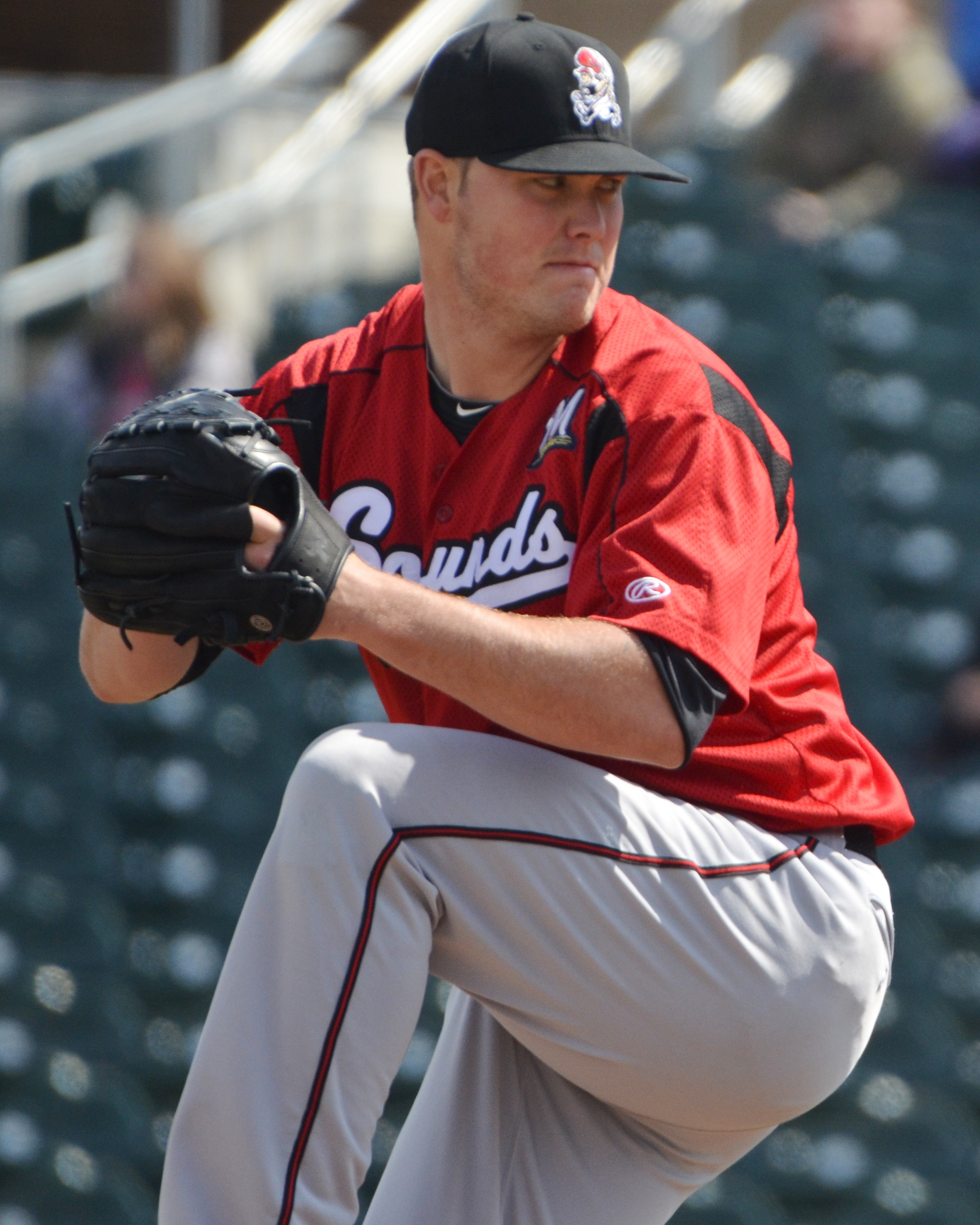
Jimmy Nelson won the PCL Pitcher of the Year Award and was selected for the Triple-A All-Star Game in 2014.

The Nashville Sounds Minor League Baseball team has played in Nashville, Tennessee, since being established in 1978 as an expansion team of the Double-A Southern League. They moved up to Triple-A in 1985 as members of the American Association, joined the Pacific Coast League in 1998, and were placed in the Triple-A East in 2021 before it was renamed the International League in 2022. In the history of the franchise, numerous teams, players, and personnel have won awards, been selected for All-Star teams, or led their league in various statistical areas.

Three Sounds have won league Most Valuable Player (MVP) awards: Steve Balboni, Brian Dayett, and Magglio Ordóñez. Twelve have won Pitcher of the Year honors: Bruce Berenyi, Geoff Combe, Andy McGaffigan, Jamie Werly, Stefan Wever, Chris Hammond, Scott Ruffcorn, R. A. Dickey, Johnny Hellweg, Jimmy Nelson, Robert Gasser, and Chad Patrick. Two have won Rookie of the Year awards: Jeff Abbott and Magglio Ordóñez. Five managers have won Manager of the Year honors: Stump Merrill, Rick Renick, Frank Kremblas, Steve Scarsone, and Rick Sweet. Two have also won the Mike Coolbaugh Award: Mike Guerrero and Rick Sweet. Three members of the front office have won Executive of the Year awards: Larry Schmittou, Dot Cloud, and Sharon Ridley. One broadcaster has won Broadcaster of the Year honors: Bob Jamison. The franchise was recognized with the Minor League Baseball Organization of the Year Award in 2022. The team won the Larry MacPhail Award in 1978, 1980, and 1981. Thirty players have been selected by their Major League Baseball organization for Player or Pitcher of the Year awards.

Seven Sounds have been chosen to participate in the All-Star Futures Game. Seventy-six players and seven managers and coaches were selected for midseason All-Star teams. Four players were chosen as the MVP for their contributions in All-Star games: Duane Walker, Ray Durham, Magglio Ordóñez, and Renato Núñez. Fifty-four players have been named to postseason All-Star teams. Nashville has honored three players by retiring their uniform numbers: Skeeter Barnes (00), Tim Dillard (17), and Don Mattingly (18). Four former Sounds have been elected to the National Baseball Hall of Fame, and one was inducted in the Southern League Hall of Fame.

A number of players have led their league in multiple statistical categories during a single season. Steve Balboni led the 1980 Southern League season in five categories: runs (101), runs batted in (122), total bases (288), home runs (30), and fielding percentage among first basemen (.990). Chris Hammond led the American Association in five areas in 1990: wins (15), winning percentage (.938 (15–1)), earned run average (2.17), strikeouts (149), and shutouts (3). Chad Patrick led the International League in five areas in 2024: wins (14), winning percentage (.933 (14–1)), earned run average (2.90), strikeouts (145), and walks plus hits per inning pitched (1.086). Skeeter Barnes (1990), Norberto Martin (1993), Drew Denson (1994), Magglio Ordóñez (1997), and Joey Wendle (2015) led single seasons in four areas each. The 1980 Sounds led the Southern League in 22 categories, the most among all Sounds teams.

== Awards ==
Key
(#)	Number of wins by individuals/teams who won an award multiple times

=== League awards ===
==== Southern League ====
These players and team personnel won Southern League year-end awards during the club's membership from 1978 to 1984.

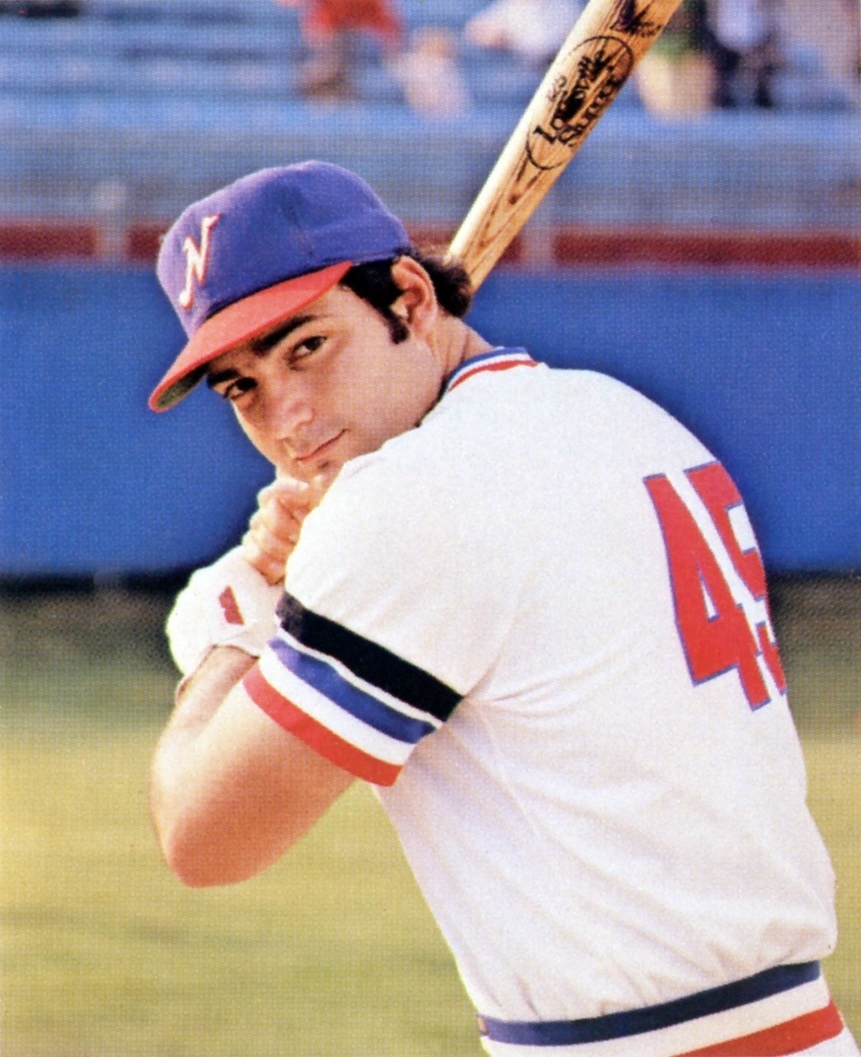
Steve Balboni, 1980 Southern League Most Valuable Player

Southern League awards
Award	Recipient	Season	Ref.
Most Valuable Player	Steve Balboni	1980	
Most Valuable Player	Brian Dayett	1982	
Most Outstanding Pitcher	Bruce Berenyi	1978	
Most Outstanding Pitcher	Geoff Combe	1979	
Most Outstanding Pitcher	Andy McGaffigan	1980	
Most Outstanding Pitcher	Jamie Werly	1981	
Most Outstanding Pitcher	Stefan Wever	1982	
Manager of the Year	Stump Merrill	1980	
Executive of the Year	Larry Schmittou	1978	
Broadcaster of the Year	Bob Jamison (1)	1980	
Broadcaster of the Year	Bob Jamison (2)	1982	

==== American Association ====
These players and team personnel won American Association year-end awards during the club's membership from 1985 to 1997.

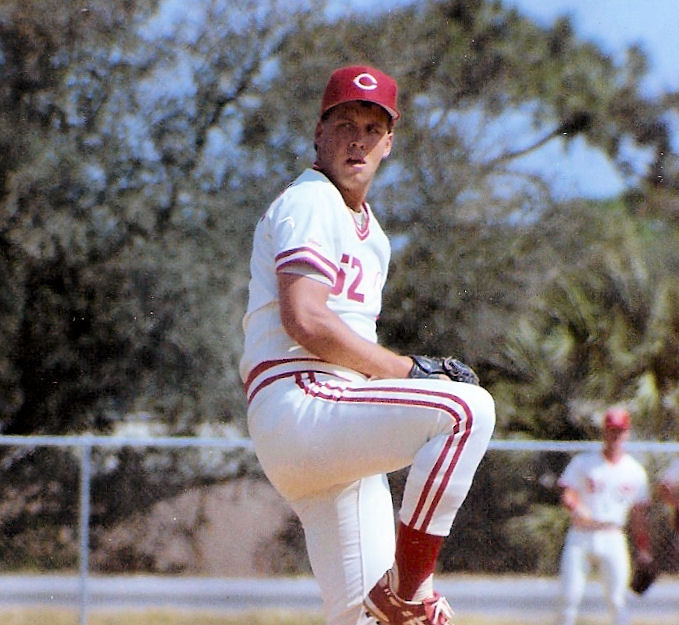
Chris Hammond, 1990 American Association Most Valuable Pitcher

American Association awards
Award	Recipient	Season	Ref.
Most Valuable Player	Magglio Ordóñez	1997	
Most Valuable Pitcher	Chris Hammond	1990	
Most Valuable Pitcher	Scott Ruffcorn	1994	
Rookie of the Year	Jeff Abbott	1996	
Rookie of the Year	Magglio Ordóñez	1997	
Manager of the Year	Rick Renick (1)	1993	
Manager of the Year	Rick Renick (2)	1996	
Executive of the Year	Larry Schmittou (1)	1987	
Executive of the Year	Larry Schmittou (2)	1989	

==== Pacific Coast League ====
These players and team personnel won Pacific Coast League year-end awards during the club's membership from 1998 to 2020.

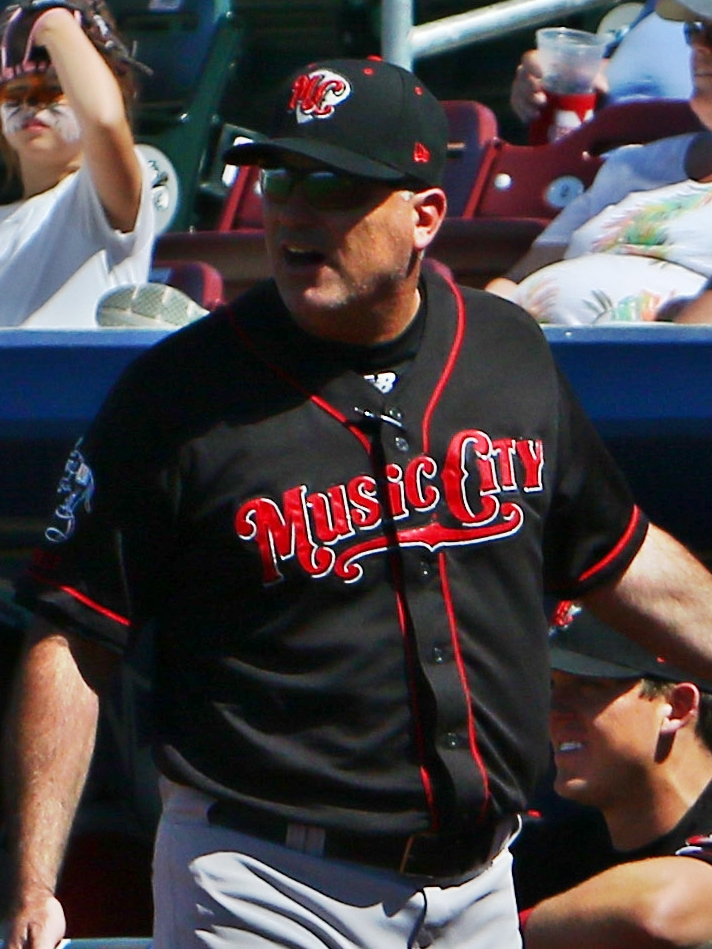
Steve Scarsone, 2016 Pacific Coast League Manager of the Year

Pacific Coast League awards
Award	Recipient	Season	Ref.
Pitcher of the Year	R. A. Dickey	2007	
Pitcher of the Year	Johnny Hellweg	2013	
Pitcher of the Year	Jimmy Nelson	2014	
Manager of the Year	Frank Kremblas	2007	
Manager of the Year	Steve Scarsone	2016	
Athletic Trainer of the Year	Jeff Paxson	2007	
Athletic Trainer of the Year	Brad LaRosa	2016	

==== International League ====
These players and team personnel have won International League year-end awards during the club's membership since 2021.

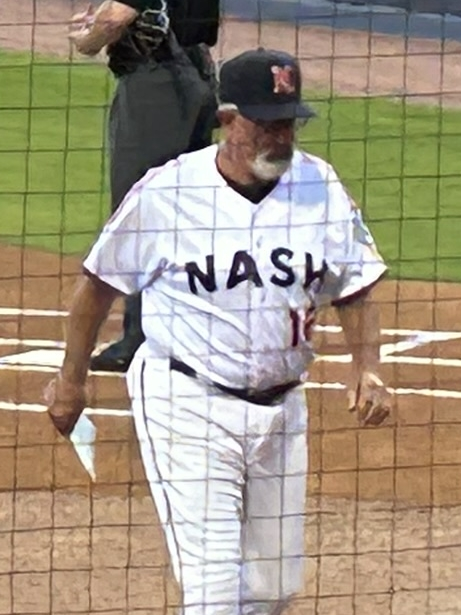
Rick Sweet, 2022 International League Manager of the Year

International League awards
Award	Recipient	Season	Ref.
Pitcher of the Year	Robert Gasser	2023	
Pitcher of the Year	Chad Patrick	2024	
Manager of the Year	Rick Sweet	2022	
Athletic Trainer of the Year	Jeff Paxson	2023	
Athletic Trainer of the Year	Jeff Paxson	2024	

=== Minor League Baseball awards ===
These teams and team personnel have won Minor League Baseball year-end awards.

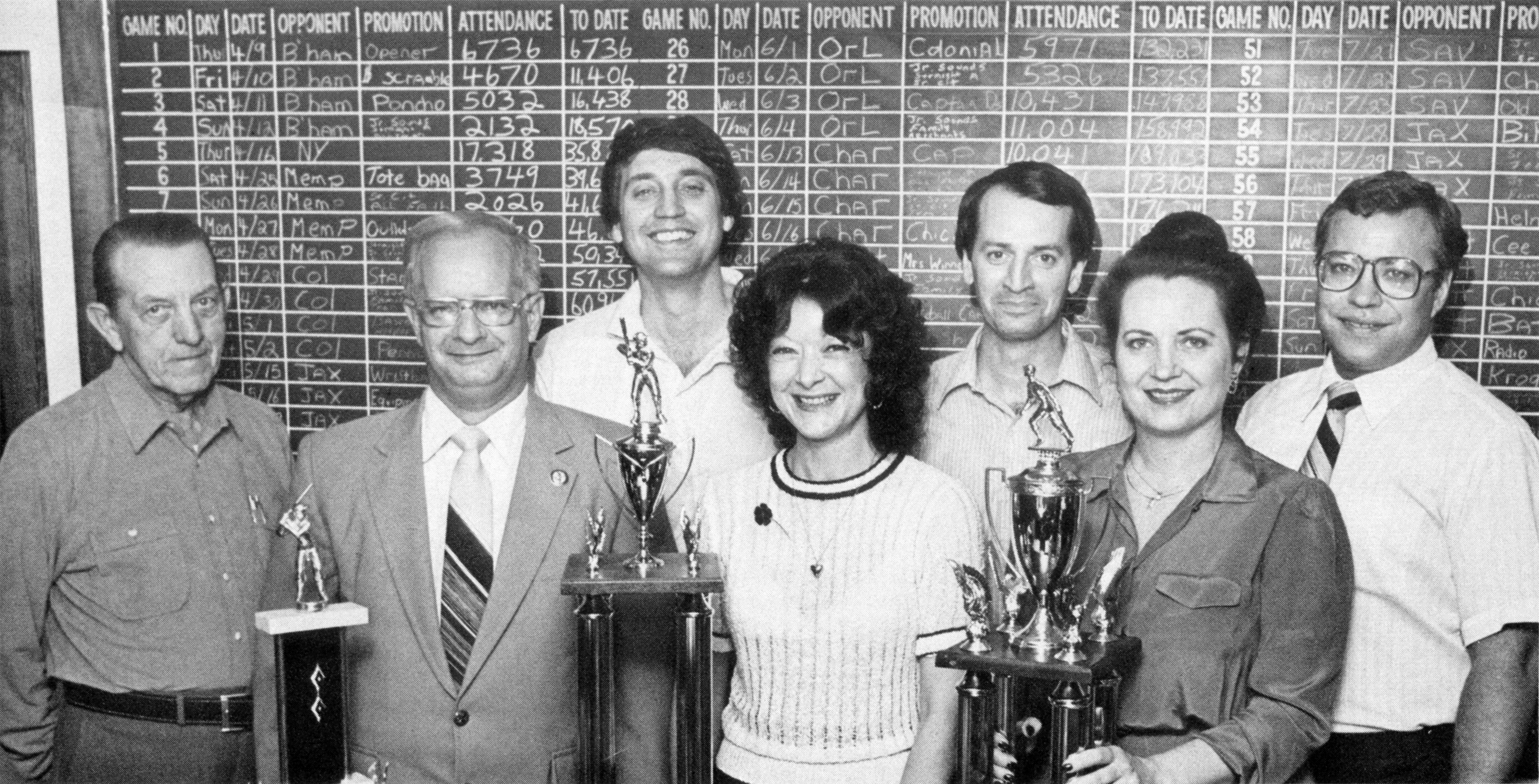
The Sounds won the Larry MacPhail Award for outstanding minor league promotions in 1978, 1980, and 1981.

Minor League Baseball awards
Award	Recipient	Season	Ref.
Organization of the Year Award	Nashville Sounds	2022	
Larry MacPhail Award	Nashville Sounds (1)	1978	
Larry MacPhail Award	Nashville Sounds (2)	1980	
Larry MacPhail Award	Nashville Sounds (3)	1981	
Mike Coolbaugh Award	Mike Guerrero	2013	
Mike Coolbaugh Award	Rick Sweet	2022	
Rawlings Award	Dot Cloud	1997	
Rawlings Award	Sharon Ridley	2010	

=== Major League Baseball organizational awards ===
These players have won year-end awards from their Major League Baseball organization.

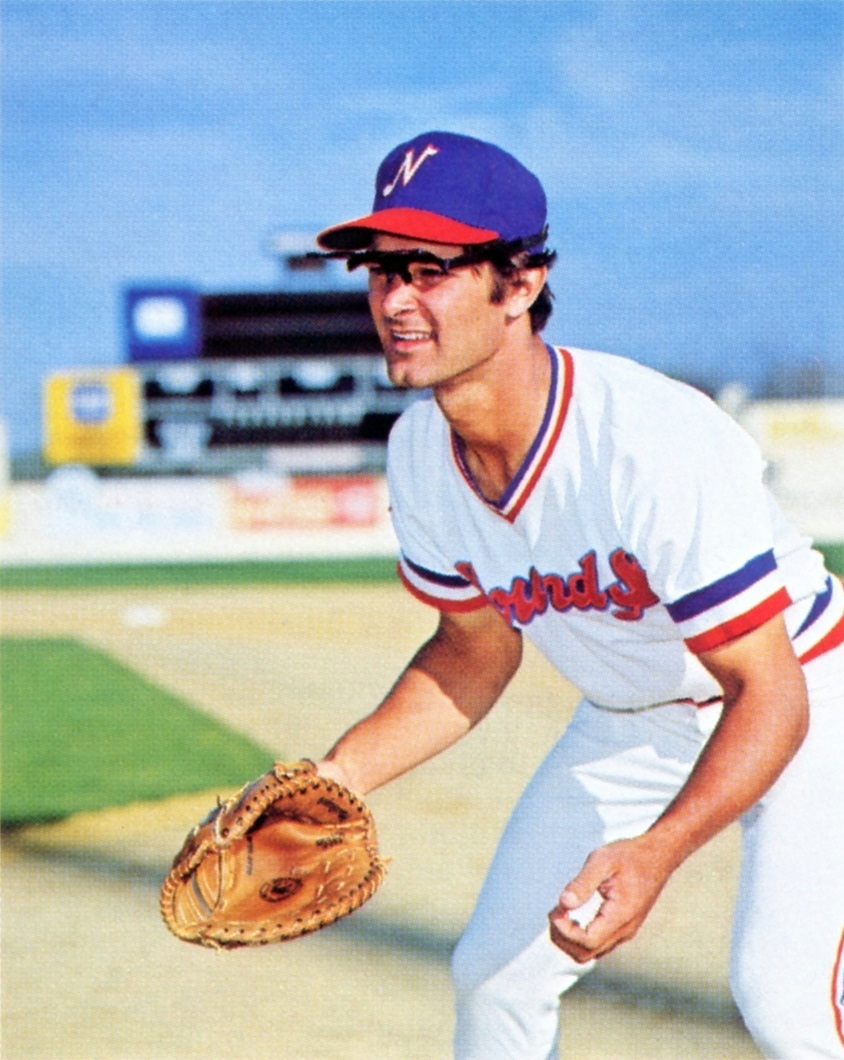
Don Mattingly, 1981 New York Yankees Minor League Player of the Year

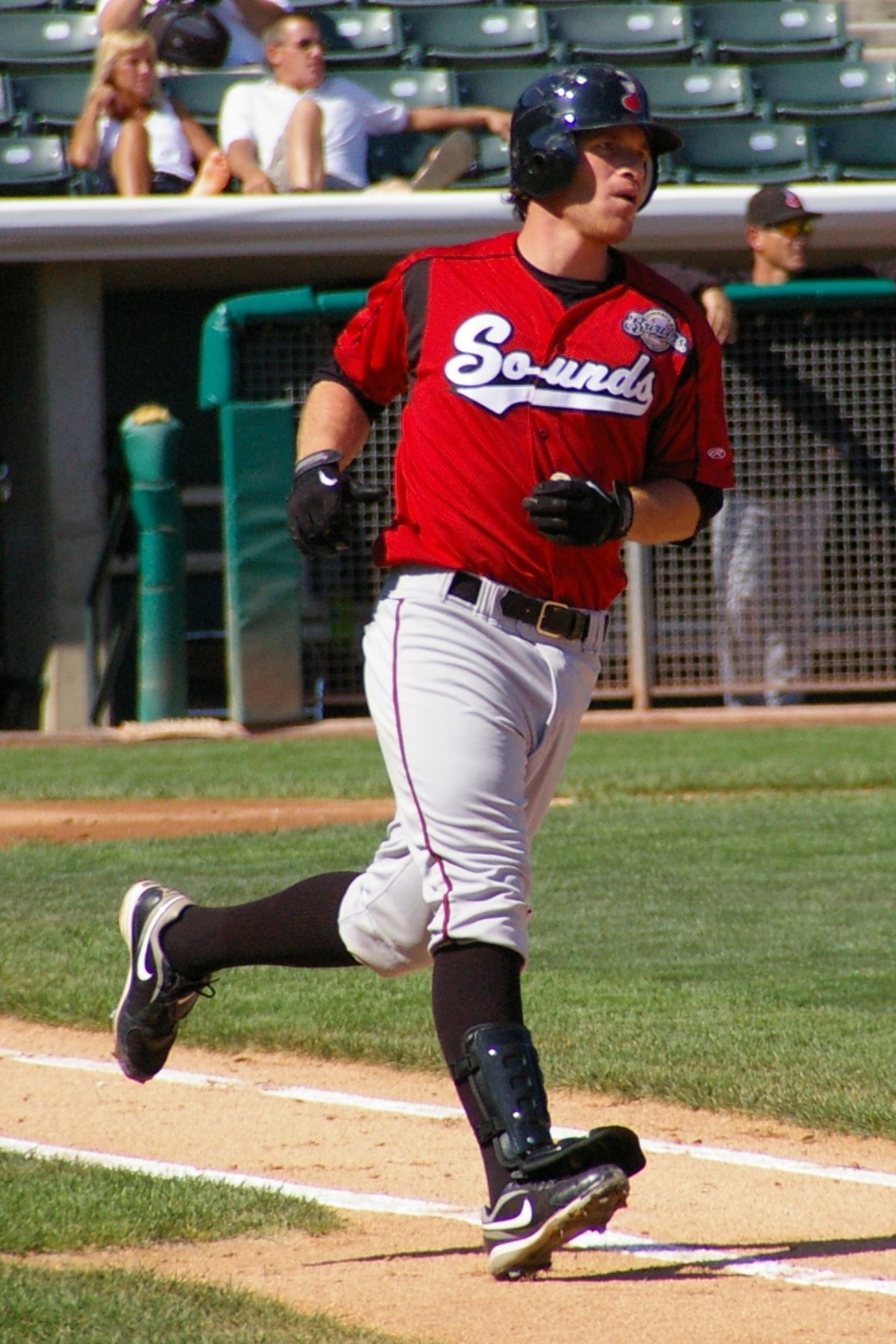
Mat Gamel, 2008 Milwaukee Brewers Minor League Player of the Year

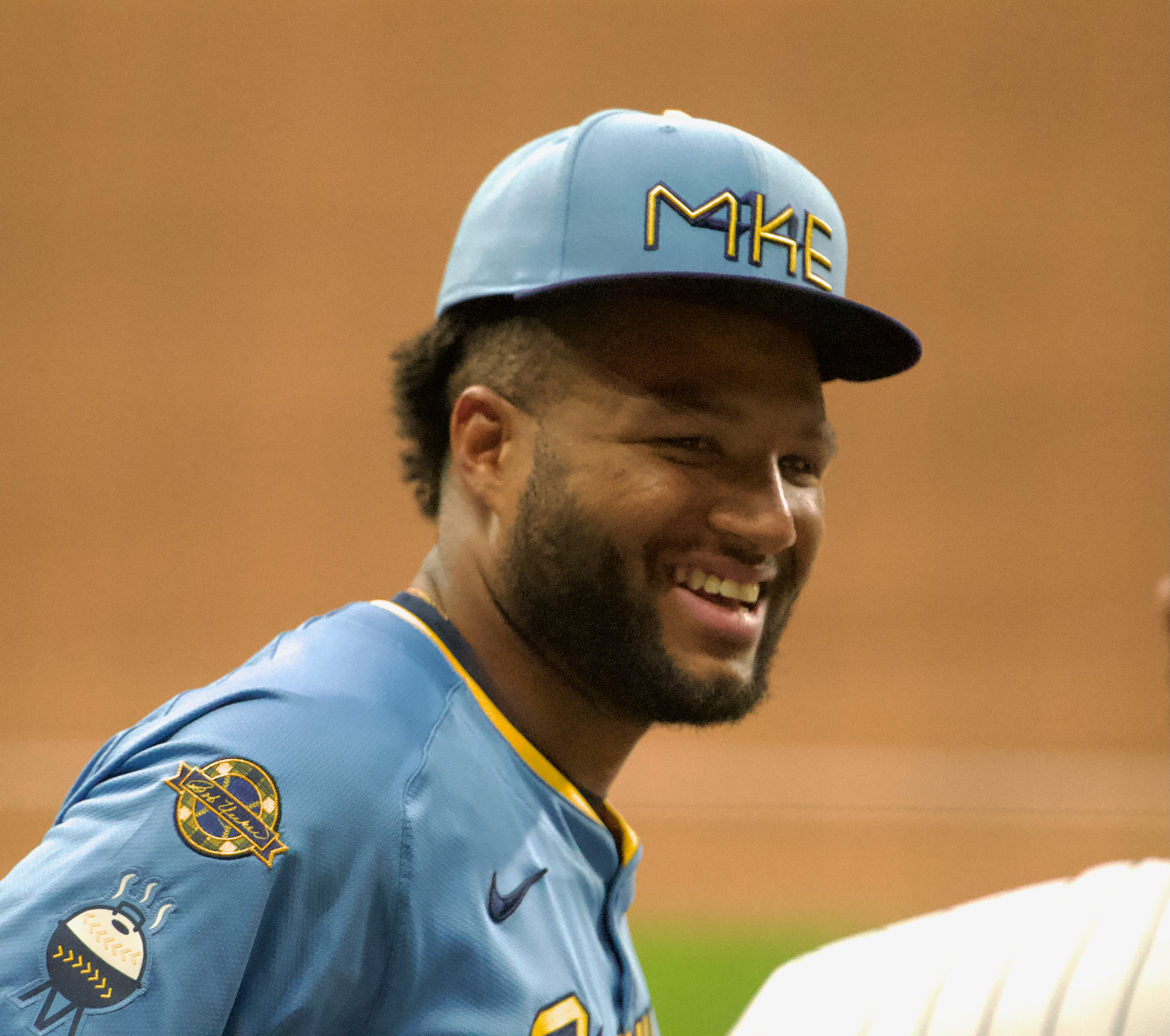
Jackson Chourio, 2023 Milwaukee Brewers Minor League Player of the Year

Major League Baseball organizational awards
Organization	Award	Recipient	Season	Refs.
New York Yankees	Minor League Player of the Year	Steve Balboni	1980	
New York Yankees	Minor League Player of the Year	Don Mattingly	1981	
New York Yankees	Minor League Pitcher of the Year	Pete Filson	1981	
New York Yankees	Minor League Player of the Year	Matt Winters	1982	
New York Yankees	Minor League Pitcher of the Year	José Rijo	1983	
New York Yankees	Minor League Pitcher of the Year	Jim Deshaies	1984	
Chicago White Sox	Minor League Player of the Year	Ray Durham	1994	
Pittsburgh Pirates	Minor League Player of the Year	Chad Hermansen	1999	
Pittsburgh Pirates	Minor League Player of the Year	Humberto Cota	2001	
Milwaukee Brewers	Minor League Player of the Year	Nelson Cruz	2005	
Milwaukee Brewers	Minor League Pitcher of the Year	Manny Parra	2007	
Milwaukee Brewers	Minor League Player of the Year	Mat Gamel	2008	
Milwaukee Brewers	Minor League Player of the Year	Taylor Green	2011	
Milwaukee Brewers	Minor League Pitcher of the Year	Mike Fiers	2011	
Milwaukee Brewers	Minor League Pitcher of the Year	Hiram Burgos	2012	
Milwaukee Brewers	Minor League Pitcher of the Year	Johnny Hellweg	2013	
Milwaukee Brewers	Minor League Pitcher of the Year	Jimmy Nelson	2014	
Oakland Athletics	Minor League Pitcher of the Year	Ryan Dull	2015	
Oakland Athletics	Minor League Player of the Year	Ryon Healy	2016	
Oakland Athletics	Minor League Pitcher of the Year	Daniel Mengden	2016	
Oakland Athletics	Minor League Player of the Year	Matt Olson	2017	
Oakland Athletics	Minor League Player of the Year	Ramón Laureano	2018	
Oakland Athletics	Minor League Pitcher of the Year	Jesús Luzardo	2018	
Texas Rangers	True Ranger Award	James Jones	2019	
Milwaukee Brewers	Minor League Pitcher of the Year	Ethan Small	2021	
Milwaukee Brewers	Minor League Player of the Year	Tyler Black	2023	
Milwaukee Brewers	Minor League Player of the Year	Jackson Chourio	2023	
Milwaukee Brewers	Minor League Pitcher of the Year	Robert Gasser	2023	
Milwaukee Brewers	Minor League Pitcher of the Year	Carlos Rodríguez	2023	
Milwaukee Brewers	Minor League Pitcher of the Year	Craig Yoho	2024	

== All-Stars ==
Key
(#)	Number of selections by players who were selected multiple times

=== All-Star Futures ===
These players have been selected to play in the All-Star Futures Game (1999–present).

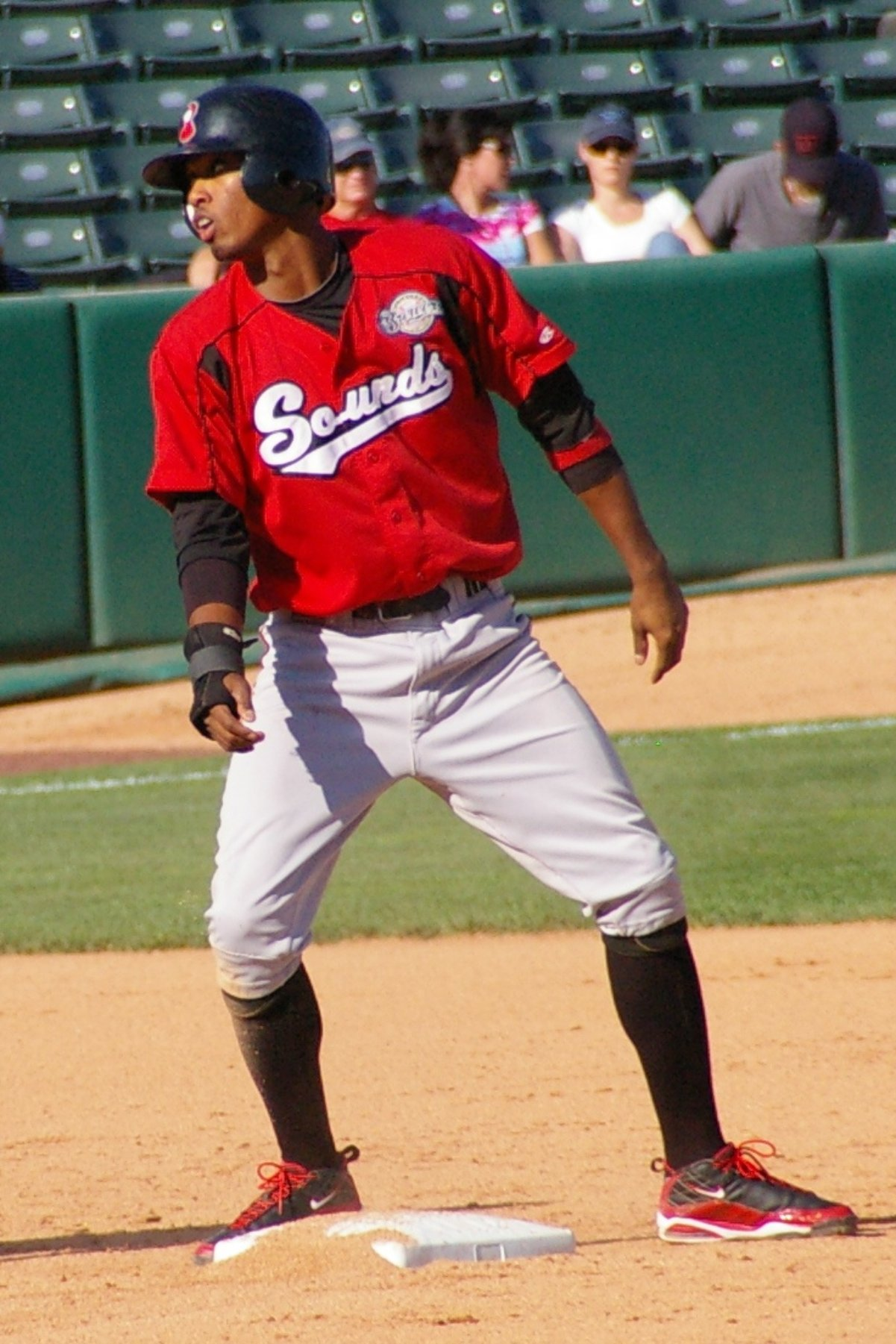
Alcides Escobar, 2009 All-Star Futures Game selection and Pacific Coast League All-Star shortstop

All-Star Futures
Season	Player	Position	Ref.
1999	Aramis Ramírez	Third baseman	
2001	Humberto Cota	Catcher	
2005	Nelson Cruz	Outfielder	
2009	Alcides Escobar	Shortstop	
2013	Jimmy Nelson	Pitcher	
2016	Ryon Healy	Third baseman	
2021	Ethan Small	Pitcher	

=== Midseason All-Stars ===
These players were selected to play in the Southern League All-Star Game (1978–1984) or the Triple-A All-Star Game (1988–2019).

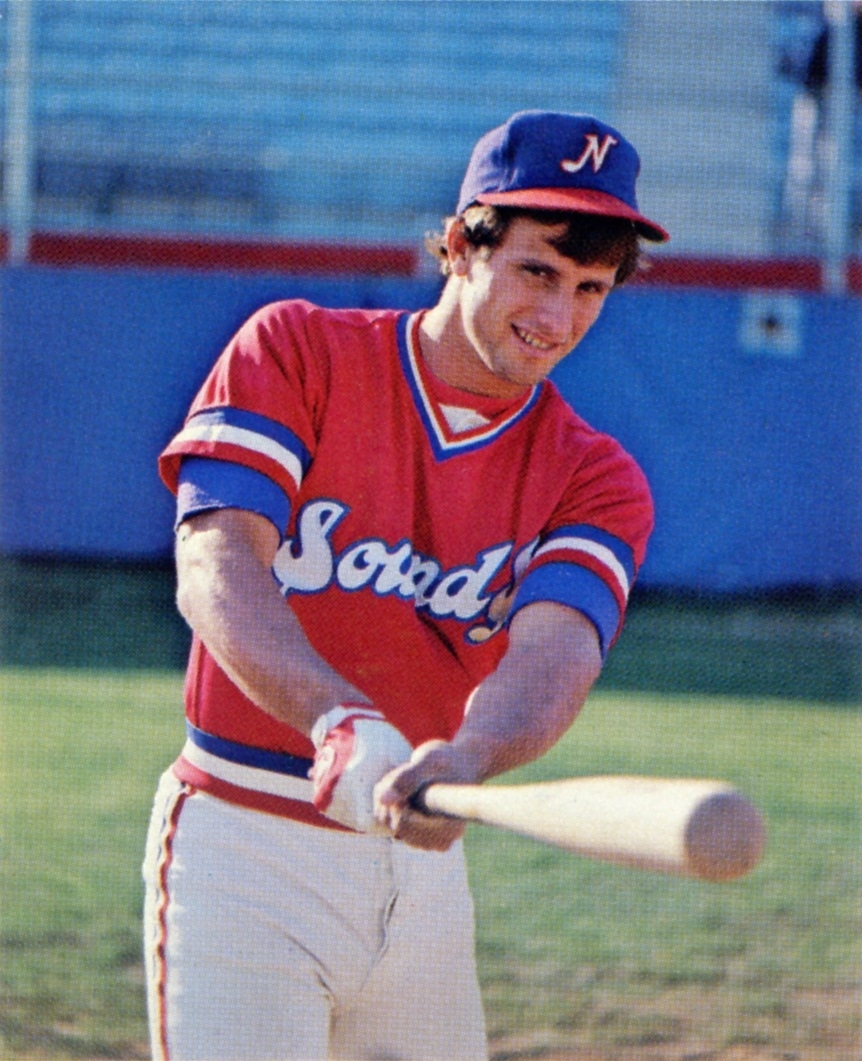
Duane Walker, 1979 Southern League All-Star outfielder and MVP

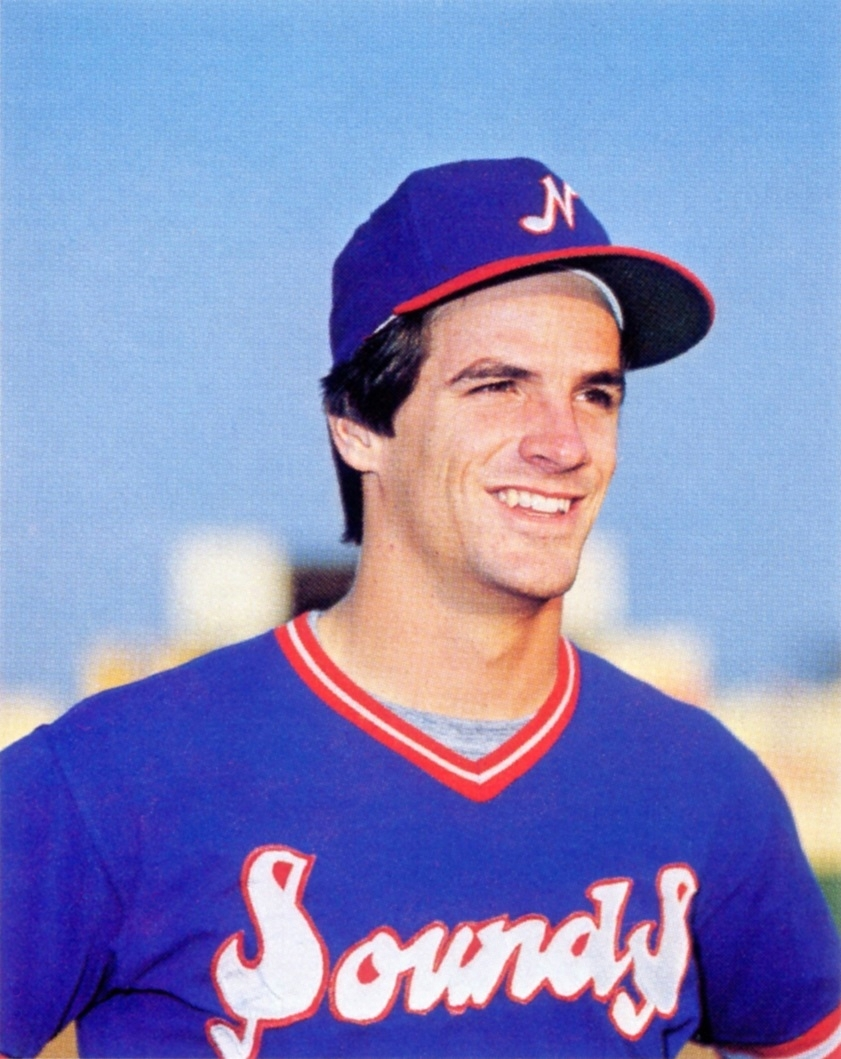
Jamie Werly, 1980 and 1981 Southern League All-Star pitcher

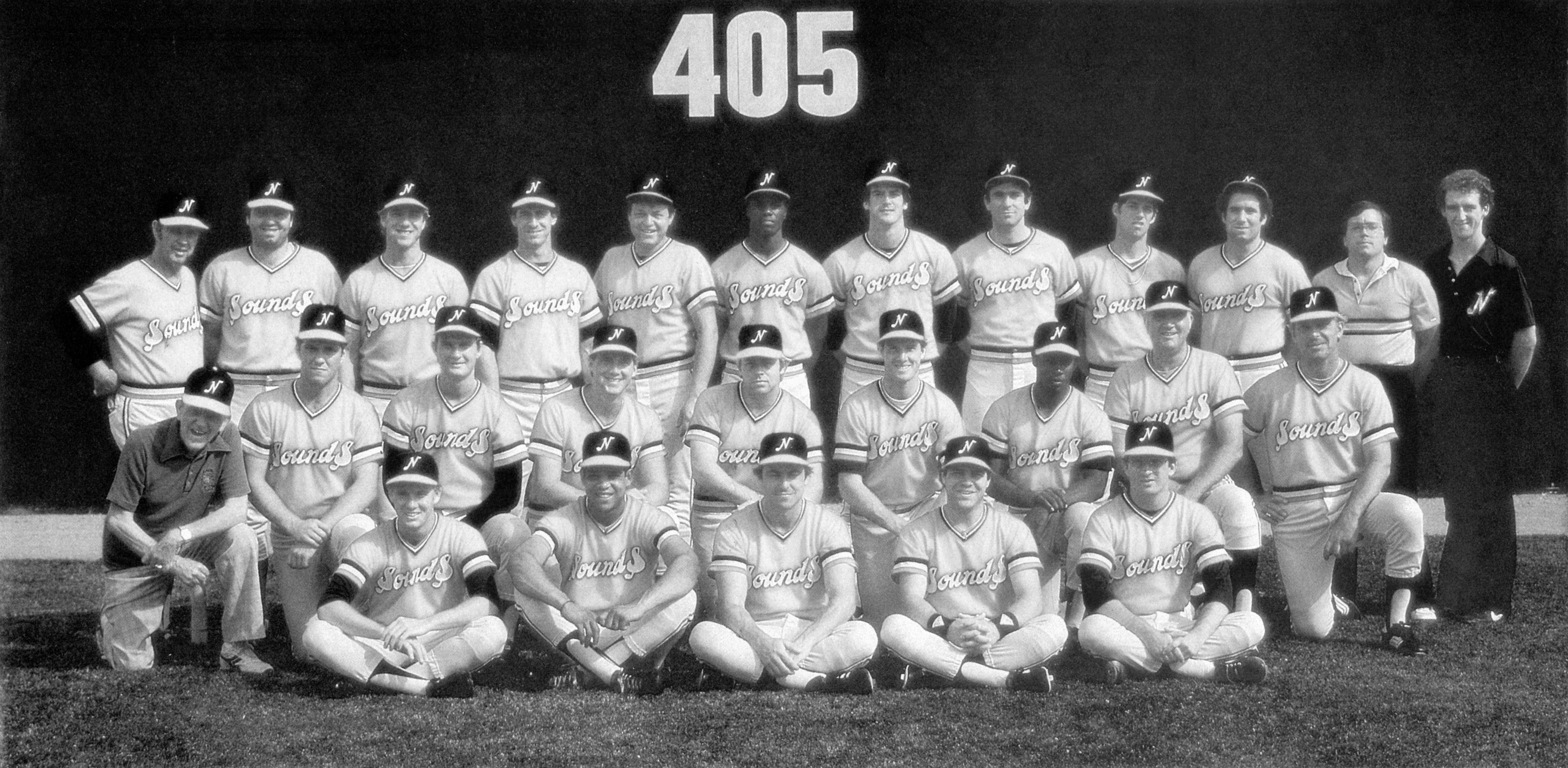
All Sounds were recognized as All-Stars in 1983 when they served as the competition in the Southern League All-Star Game.

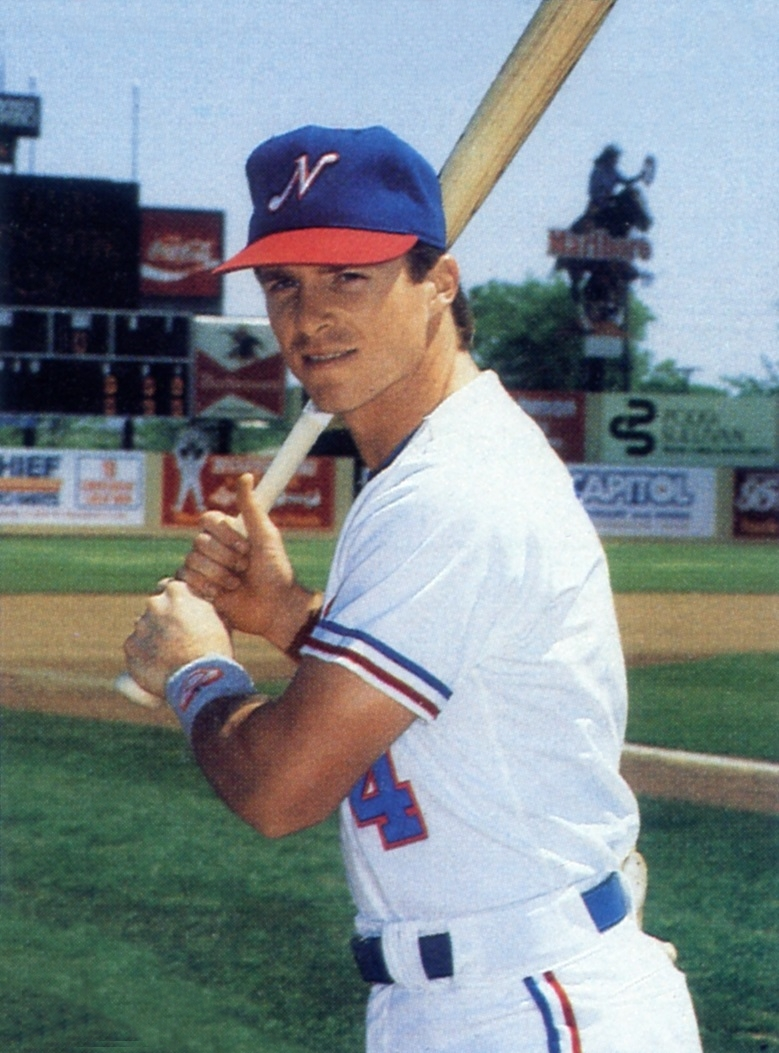
Marty Brown, 1988 Southern League All-Star third baseman

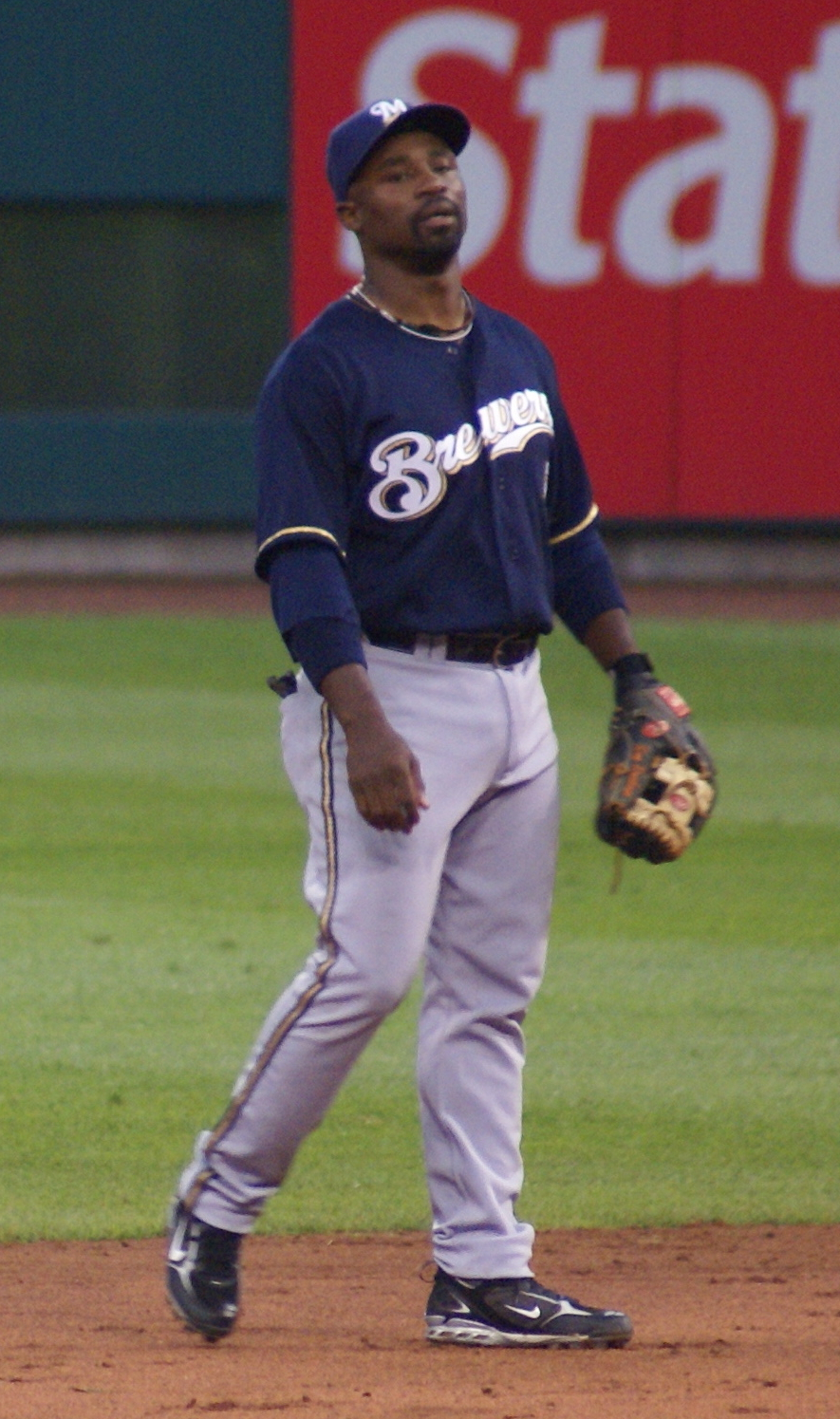
Ray Durham, 1994 American Association All-Star second baseman and MVP

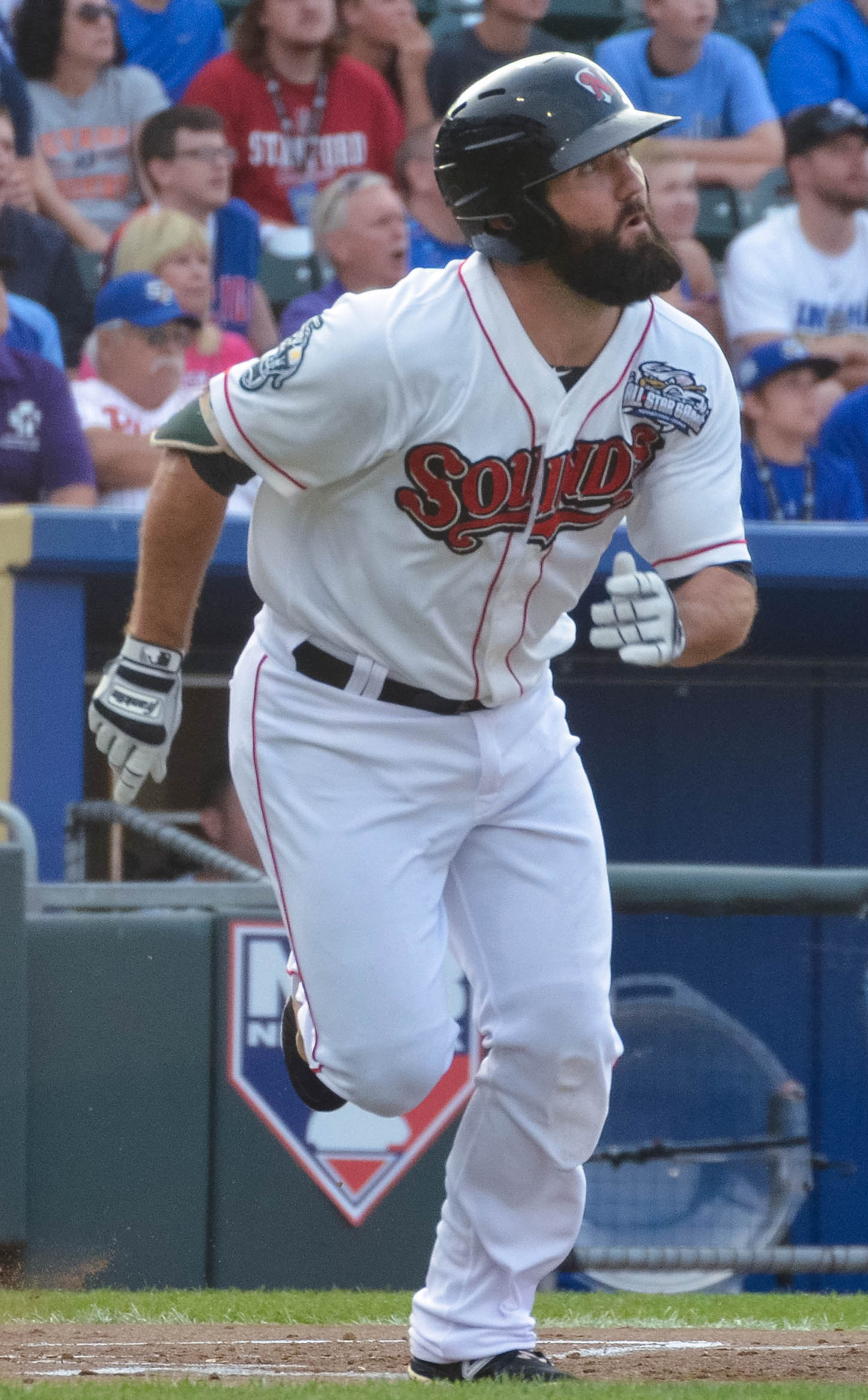
Jason Pridie, 2015 Pacific Coast League All-Star outfielder

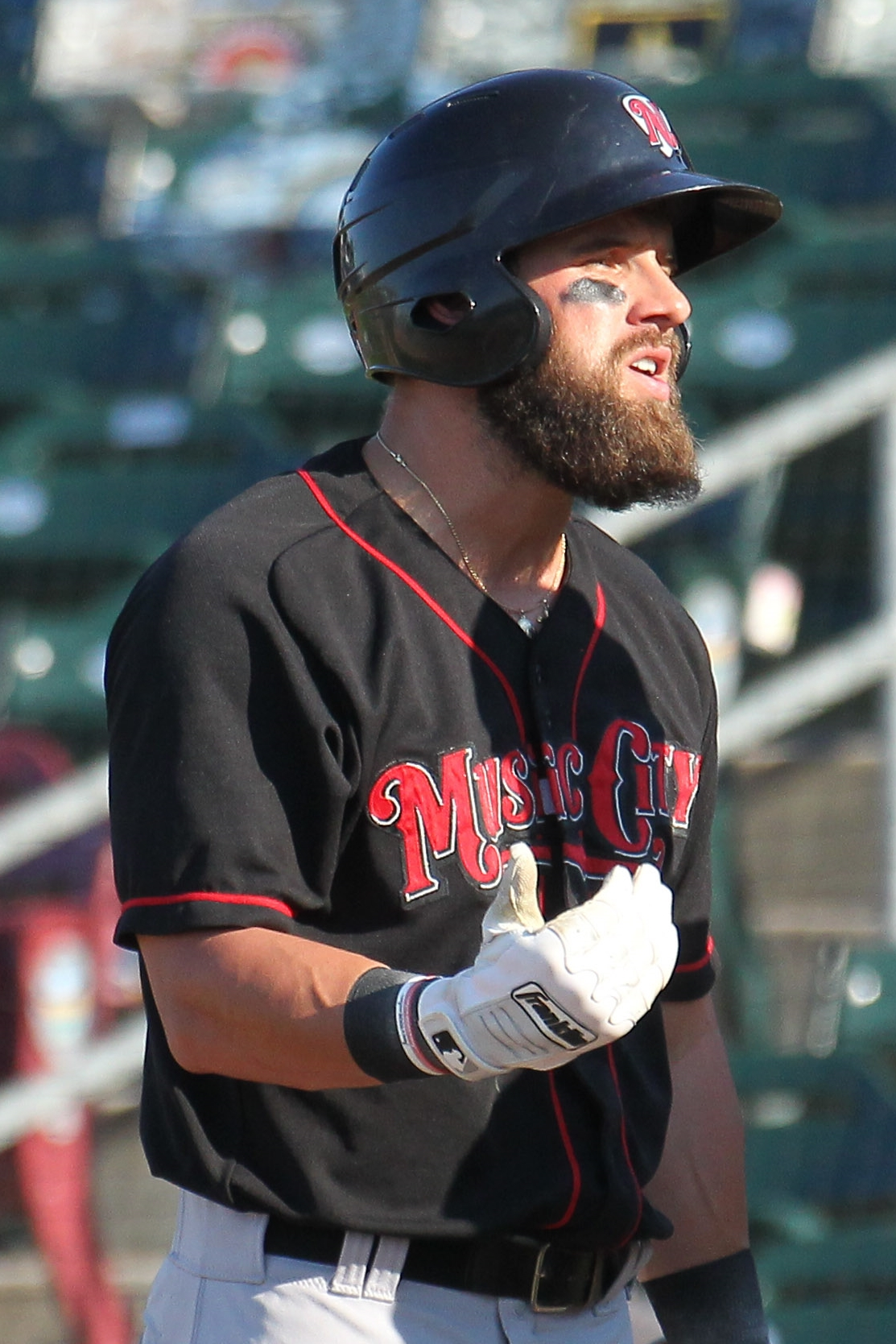
Nick Martini, 2018 Pacific Coast League All-Star first baseman

Midseason All-Stars
Season	Player	Position	Ref.
1978	Bruce Berenyi	Pitcher	
1979	Geoff Combe	Pitcher	
1979	Paul Householder	Outfielder	
1979	Dave Van Gorder	Catcher	
1979	Duane Walker	Outfielder	
1979	George Scherger	Coach	
1980	Steve Balboni	First baseman	
1980	Tom Filer	Pitcher	
1980	Buck Showalter	Designated hitter	
1980	Jamie Werly (1)	Pitcher	
1981	Don Mattingly	First baseman	
1981	Jamie Werly (2)	Pitcher	
1982	Clay Christiansen	Pitcher	
1982	Brian Dayett	Outfielder	
1982	Erik Peterson	Third baseman	
1982	Stefan Wever	Pitcher	
1983	Nashville Sounds (Note: No Sounds could be voted onto the 1983 Southern League All-Star team, as Nashville was to serve as the team's competition. In lieu of this, the league chose to recognize all Sounds players as All-Stars.)	—	
1984	Tom Barrett	Second baseman	
1984	Pat Dempsey	Catcher	
1984	Dan Pasqua	Outfielder	
1984	Keith Smith	Shortstop	
1988	Marty Brown	Third baseman	
1988	Hugh Kemp	Pitcher	
1989	Skeeter Barnes	Left fielder	
1989	Scotti Madison	First baseman	
1990	Leo García	Center fielder	
1991	Terry Lee	First baseman	
1991	Pete Mackanin	Coach	
1992	Gerónimo Berroa	Right fielder	
1992	Joey Vierra (1)	Pitcher	
1993	Drew Denson (1)	First baseman	
1993	Brian Drahman	Pitcher	
1994	Drew Denson (2)	Designated hitter	
1994	Ray Durham	Second baseman	
1994	Scott Ruffcorn (1)	Pitcher	
1994	Steve Schrenk	Pitcher	
1994	Rick Renick	Manager	
1995	Fernando Ramsey	Center fielder	
1995	Joey Vierra (2)	Pitcher	
1996	Jeff Abbott	Left fielder	
1996	Scott Ruffcorn (2)	Pitcher	
1997	Magglio Ordóñez	Center fielder	
1997	Jeff Darwin	Pitcher	
1998	Jeff McCurry	Pitcher	
1999	Matt Ryan	Pitcher	
2000	Craig Wilson	Catcher	
2001	Luis Figueroa	Second baseman	
2001	Tike Redman	Center fielder	
2001	Don Wengert	Pitcher	
2002	Mendy López	Shortstop	
2003	Mark Corey	Pitcher	
2003	John Wasdin	Pitcher	
2004	Dave Williams	Pitcher	
2005	Corey Hart	Left fielder	
2006	Nelson Cruz	Right fielder	
2006	Tony Gwynn Jr.	Center fielder	
2006	Ben Hendrickson	Pitcher	
2006	Stan Kyles	Coach	
2007	Steve Bray	Pitcher	
2007	Vinny Rottino (1)	Catcher	
2008	Lindsay Gulin	Pitcher	
2008	Luis Peña	Pitcher	
2008	Vinny Rottino (2)	Catcher	
2009	Alcides Escobar	Shortstop	
2009	Brendan Katin	Right fielder	
2009	R. J. Swindle	Pitcher	
2010	Luis Cruz	Shortstop	
2010	Mike McClendon	Pitcher	
2011	Mark DiFelice	Pitcher	
2011	Sam Narron	Pitcher	
2011	Rich Gale	Coach	
2012	Jim Henderson	Pitcher	
2013	Rob Wooten	Pitcher	
2014	Mike Fiers	Pitcher	
2014	Donovan Hand	Pitcher	
2014	Jimmy Nelson	Pitcher	
2014	Bob Skube	Coach	
2015	Jason Pridie	Left fielder	
2016	Chad Pinder	Shortstop	
2016	Patrick Schuster	Pitcher	
2017	Paul Blackburn	Pitcher	
2017	Renato Núñez	Left fielder	
2017	Chris Smith	Pitcher	
2017	Rick Rodriguez	Coach	
2018	Nick Martini	First baseman	
2018	James Naile	Pitcher	
2018	Bobby Wahl	Pitcher	
2019	David Carpenter	Pitcher	
2019	Seth Maness	Pitcher	

=== All-Star Game MVPs ===
These players won Most Valuable Player (MVP) Awards for their contributions in the Southern League All-Star Game (1978–1984) or the Triple-A All-Star Game (1988–2019).

All-Star Game MVPs
Season	Player	Position	Ref.
1979	Duane Walker	Outfielder	
1994	Ray Durham	Second baseman	
1997	Magglio Ordóñez	Center fielder	
2017	Renato Núñez	Left fielder	

=== Postseason All-Stars ===
These players have been selected for league postseason All-Star teams.

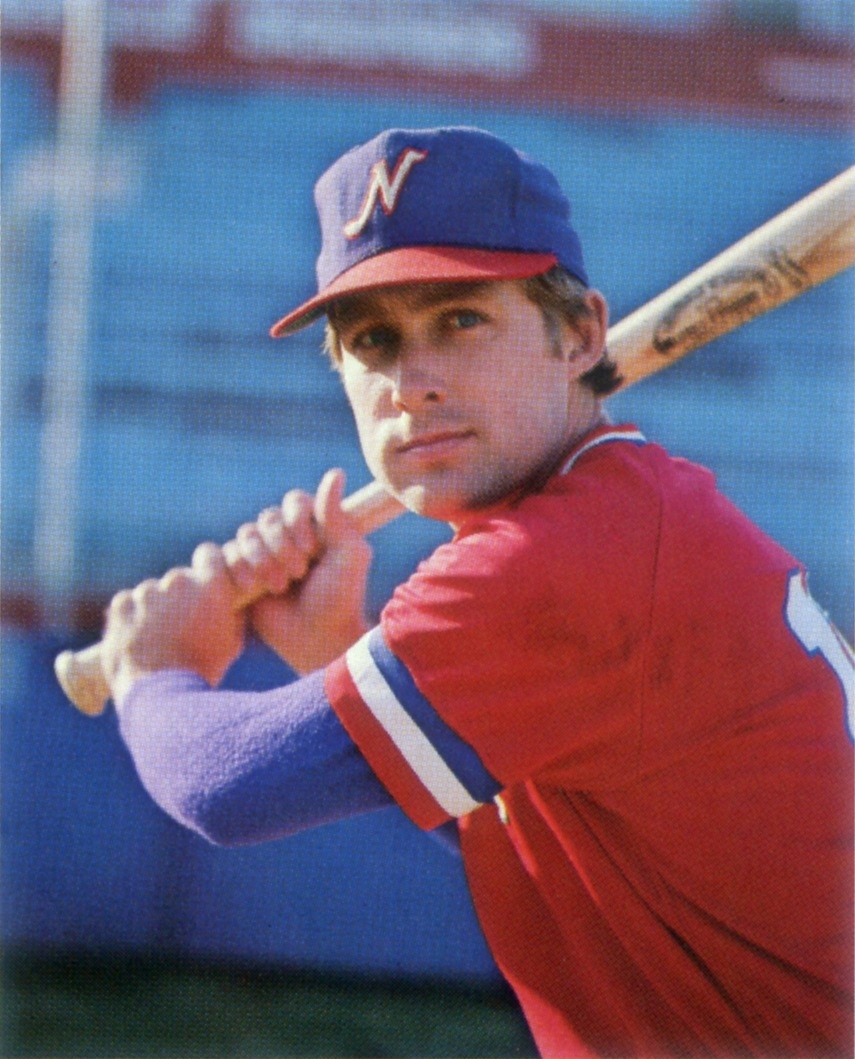
Gene Menees, 1978 Southern League postseason All-Star second baseman

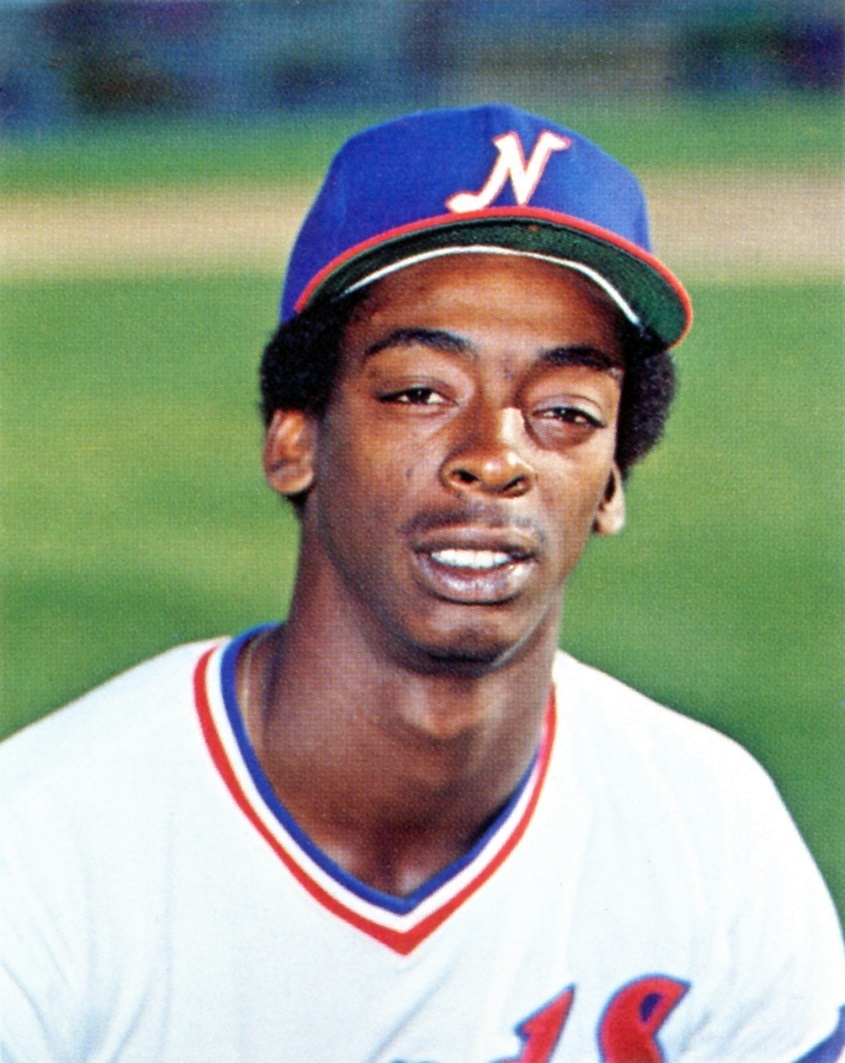
Willie McGee, 1981 Southern League postseason All-Star outfielder

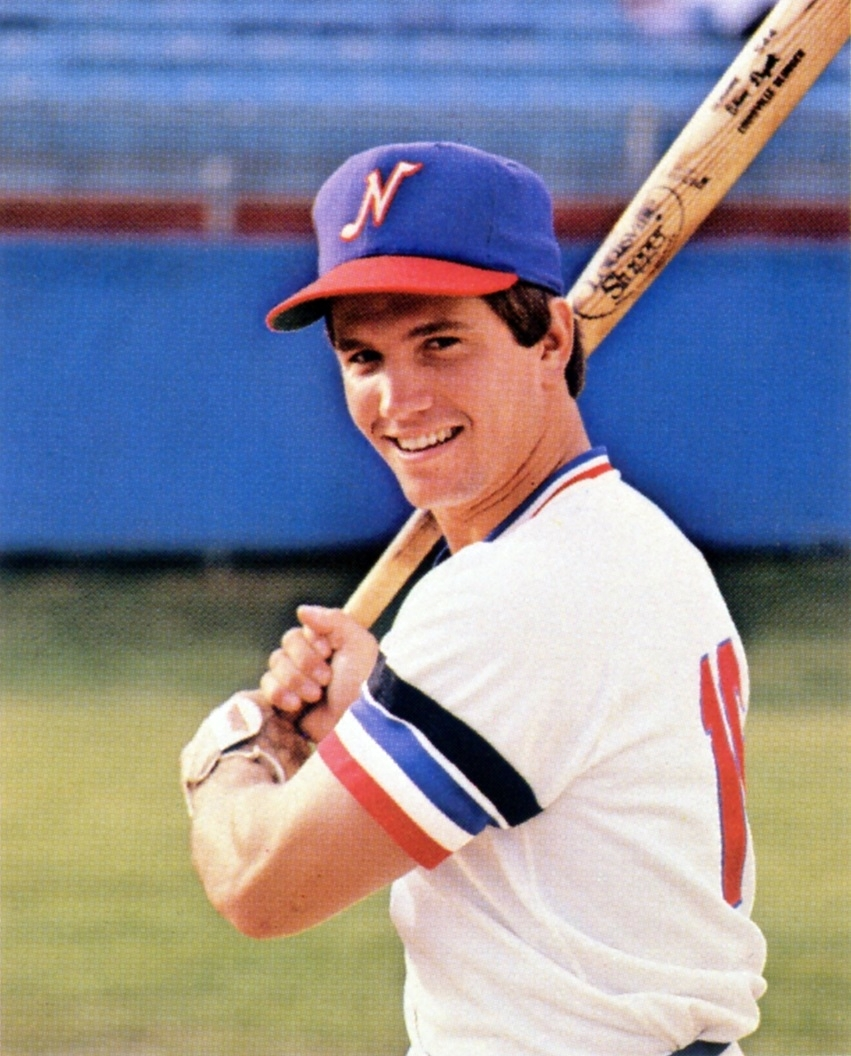
Brian Dayett, 1982 Southern League postseason All-Star outfielder

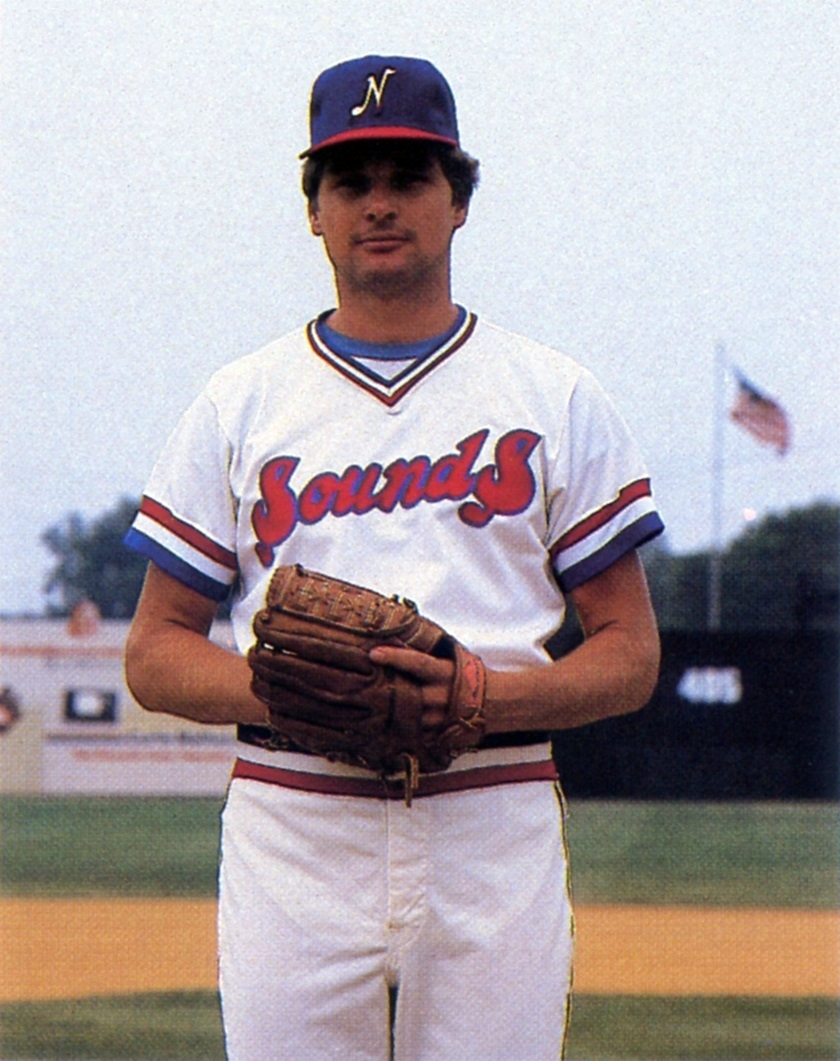
Stefan Wever, 1982 Southern League postseason All-Star right-handed pitcher

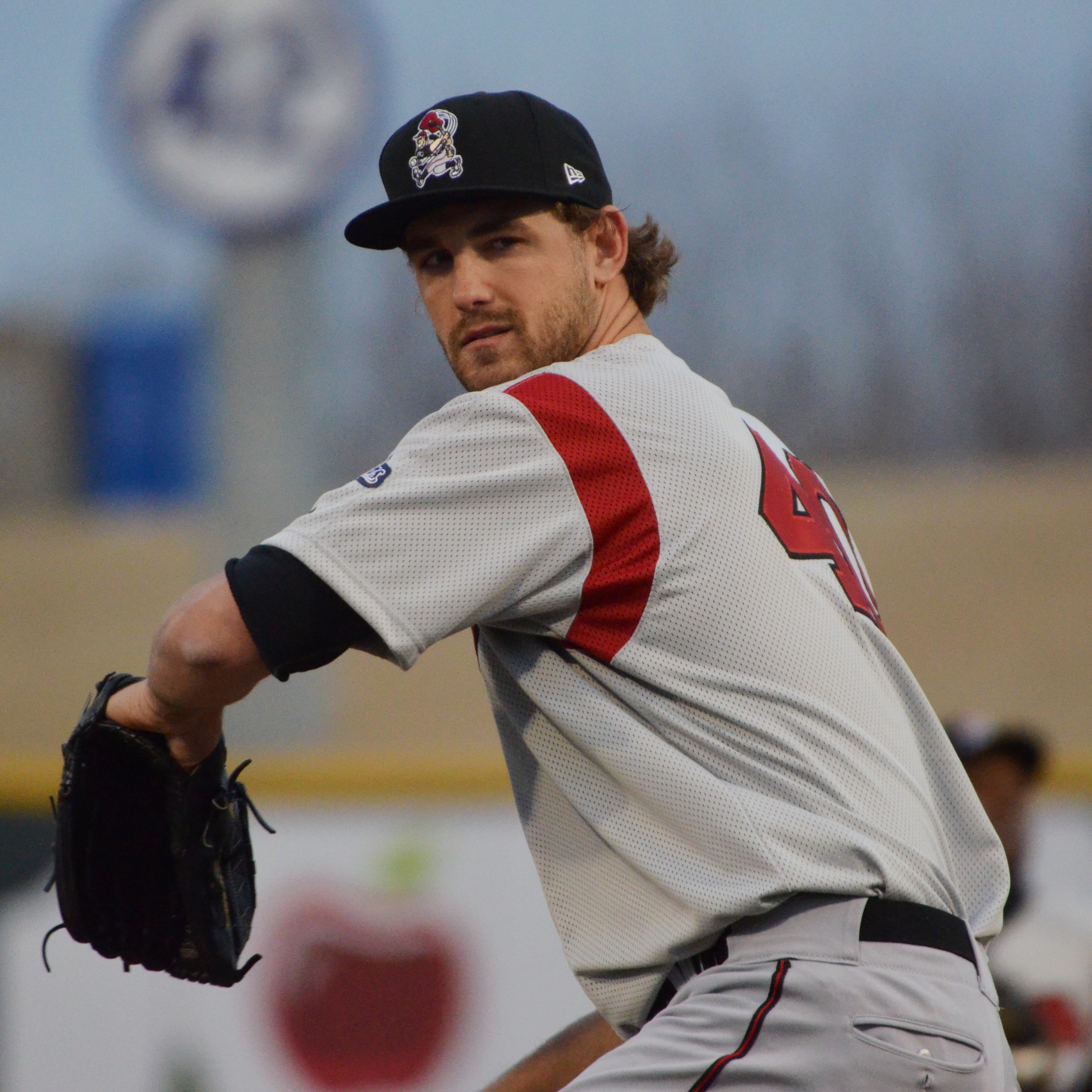
Johnny Hellweg, 2013 Pacific Coast League postseason All-Star right-handed pitcher

Postseason All-Stars
Season	Player	Position	Ref.
1978	Bruce Berenyi	Right-handed pitcher	
1978	Gene Menees	Second baseman	
1979	Geoff Combe	Right-handed pitcher	
1979	Paul Householder	Outfielder	
1979	Duane Walker (1)	Outfielder	
1979	Duane Walker (2)	Best Hustler	
1980	Steve Balboni	First baseman	
1980	Andy McGaffigan	Right-handed pitcher	
1980	Buck Showalter	Outfielder	
1980	Pat Tabler	Second baseman	
1981	Don Mattingly	Shortstop	
1981	Willie McGee	Outfielder	
1981	Jamie Werly	Right-handed pitcher	
1982	Brian Dayett	Outfielder	
1982	Erik Peterson	Utility	
1982	Stefan Wever	Right-handed pitcher	
1983	Matt Gallegos	Best Hustler	
1984	Tom Barrett	Best Hustler	
1984	Dan Pasqua	Outfielder	
1984	Keith Smith	Shortstop	
1985	Darrell Brown	Outfielder	
1985	Scotti Madison	Catcher	
1986	Bruce Fields	Outfielder	
1986	Germán Rivera	Third baseman	
1988	Norm Charlton	Left-handed pitcher	
1988	Van Snider	Outfielder	
1989	Skeeter Barnes	Outfielder	
1990	Chris Hammond	Left-handed pitcher	
1991	Terry Lee	First baseman	
1992	Gerónimo Berroa	Outfielder	
1993	Esteban Beltré	Shortstop	
1993	Norberto Martin	Second baseman	
1994	Drew Denson	Designated hitter	
1994	Ray Durham	Second baseman	
1994	Scott Ruffcorn	Right-handed pitcher	
1996	Jeff Abbott (1)	Outfielder	
1997	Jeff Abbott (2)	Outfielder	
1997	Magglio Ordóñez	Outfielder	
1999	Chad Hermansen	Designated hitter	
2000	Craig Wilson	Catcher	
2003	John Barnes	Outfielder	
2003	Mark Corey	Relief pitcher	
2007	Adam Pettyjohn	Left-handed pitcher	
2007	R. A. Dickey	Right-handed pitcher	
2009	Alcides Escobar	Shortstop	
2011	Taylor Green	Third baseman	
2013	Johnny Hellweg	Right-handed pitcher	
2014	Jimmy Nelson	Right-handed pitcher	
2015	Joey Wendle	Second baseman	
2017	Renato Núñez	Designated hitter	
2019	David Carpenter	Right-handed pitcher	
2021	Luke Barker	Relief pitcher	
2023	Robert Gasser	Starting pitcher	
2024	Chad Patrick	Starting pitcher	
2025	Craig Yoho	Relief pitcher	
2026	Luis Lara	Outfielder	

== Other achievements ==
=== Retired numbers ===
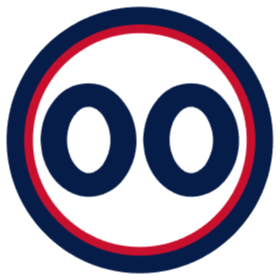
Skeeter Barnes' number 00 was retired in 1991.

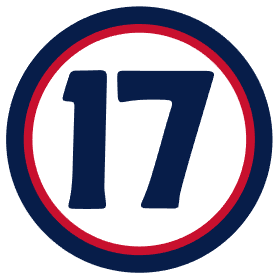
Tim Dillard's number 17 was retired in 2022.

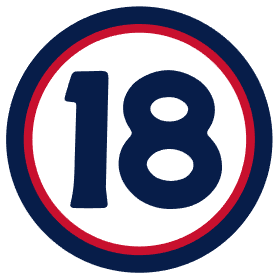
Don Mattingly's number 18 was retired in 1999.

The Sounds have honored three players by retiring their uniform numbers. This ensures that the number will be associated with one player of particular importance to the team. An additional number, 42, was retired throughout professional baseball in 1997 to honor Jackie Robinson, the first African American to play in Major League Baseball in the modern era.

Retired numbers
No.	Name	Season(s)	Position(s)	Ref.
00	Skeeter Barnes	1979, 1988–1990	Third baseman/outfielder	
17	Tim Dillard	2007–2014, 2019	Pitcher	
18	Don Mattingly	1981	First baseman	
42	Jackie Robinson	—	Second baseman	

=== Baseball Hall of Famers ===
These players and team personnel have been inducted into the National Baseball Hall of Fame.

Baseball Hall of Famers
Year	Name	Season(s)	Position	Refs.
1985	Hoyt Wilhelm	1982–1984	Pitching coach	
2012	Barry Larkin	1989	Shortstop	
2017	Tim Raines	1993	Outfielder	
2018	Trevor Hoffman	1992	Closer	

=== Southern League Hall of Famers ===
These team personnel were inducted into the Southern League Hall of Fame.

Southern League Hall of Famers
Year	Name	Seasons	Positions	Ref.
2016	Larry Schmittou	1978–1996	Owner/executive	

== League leaders ==
Key
*^{(#)}	Tie between two or more individuals/teams; number indicates total number of individuals/teams with same performance

=== Individual leaders ===
==== Batting leaders ====
These players led all other players in their league with the best performance in distinct statistical batting categories in a single season. A batter must have at least 2.7 plate appearances per the number of scheduled regular-season games to qualify for the lead in batting average, on-base percentage, slugging percentage, or on-base plus slugging.

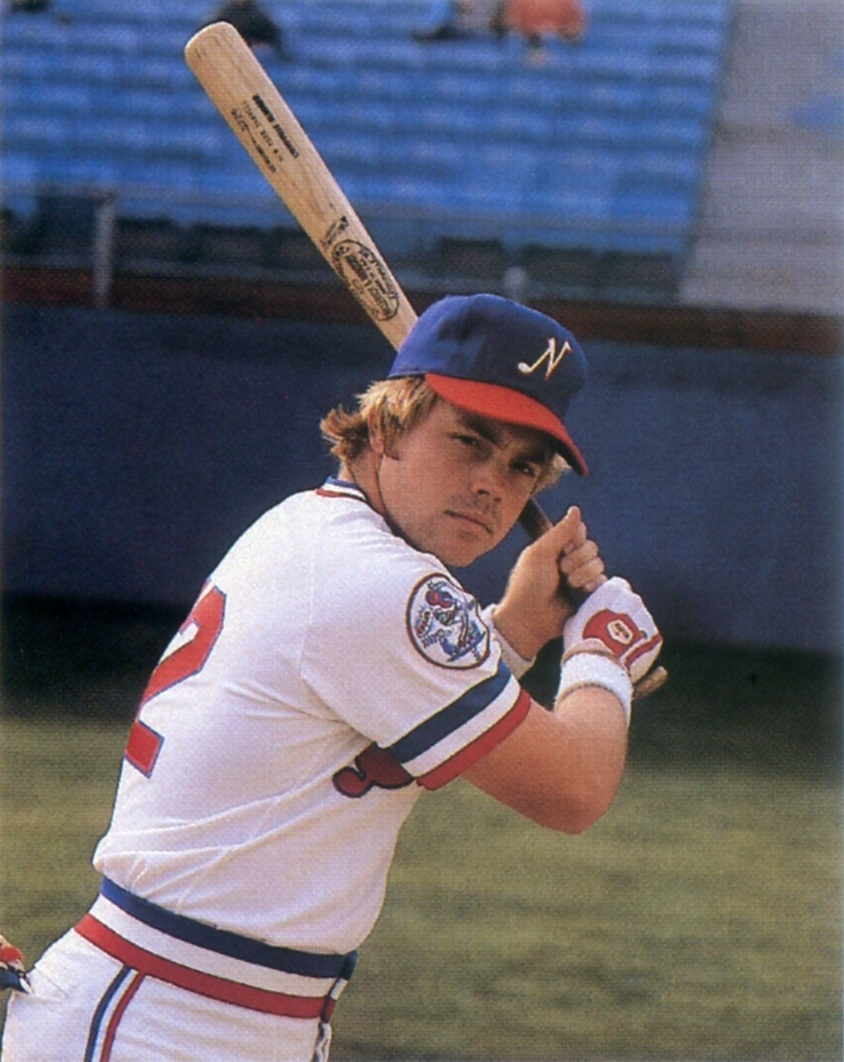
Buck Showalter, 1980 and 1982 SL leader in hits (178 and 152)

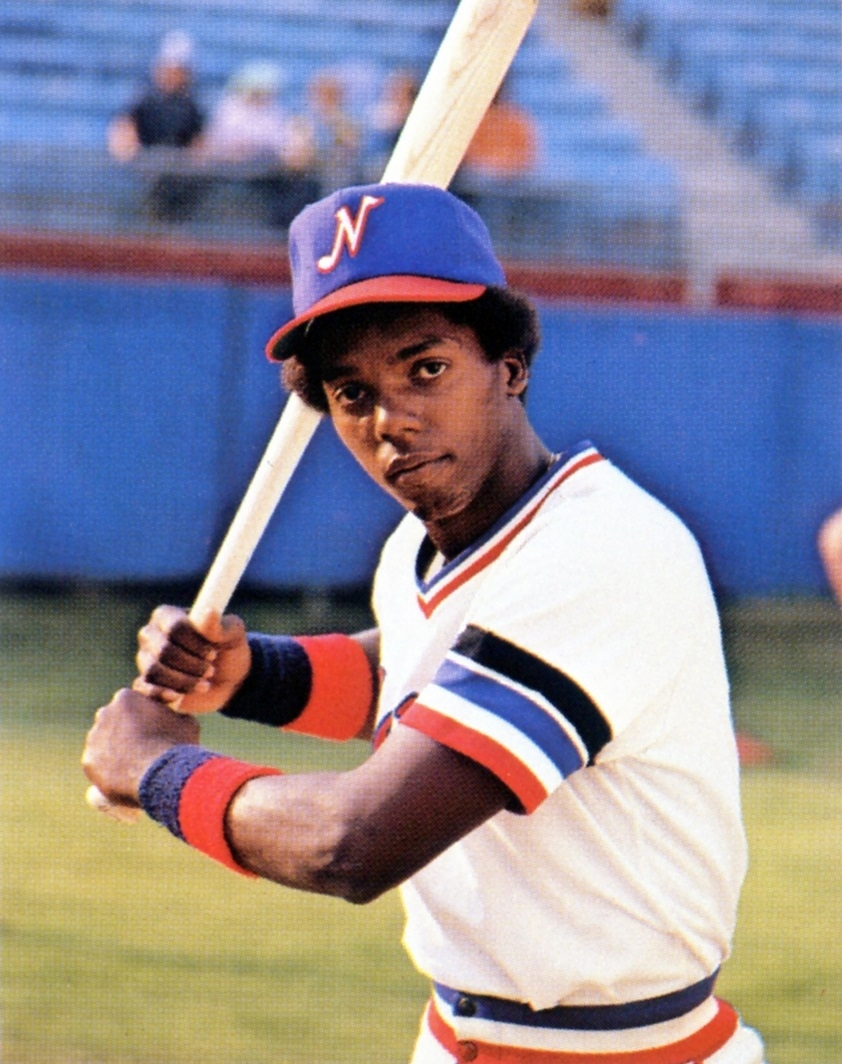
Ted Wilborn, 1980 SL leader in triples (14) and 1981 leader in runs (106)

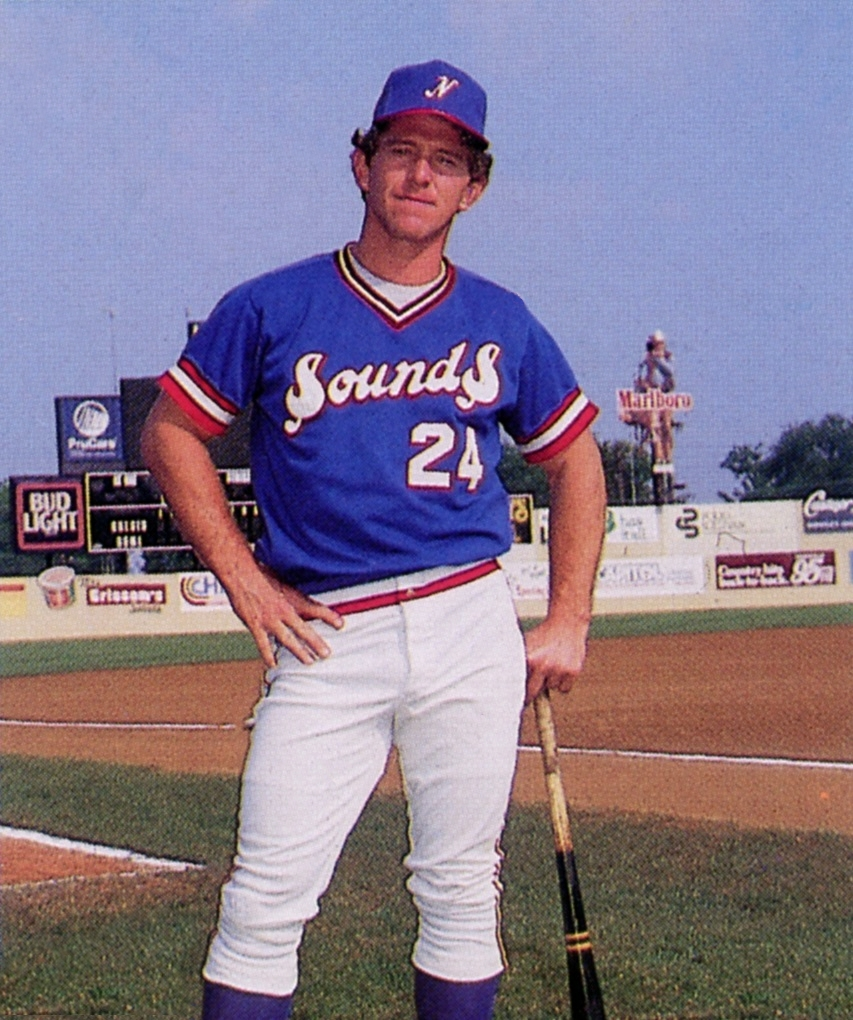
Scotti Madison, 1985 AA leader in batting average (.341), on-base percentage (.423), slugging percentage (.590), and OPS (1.013)

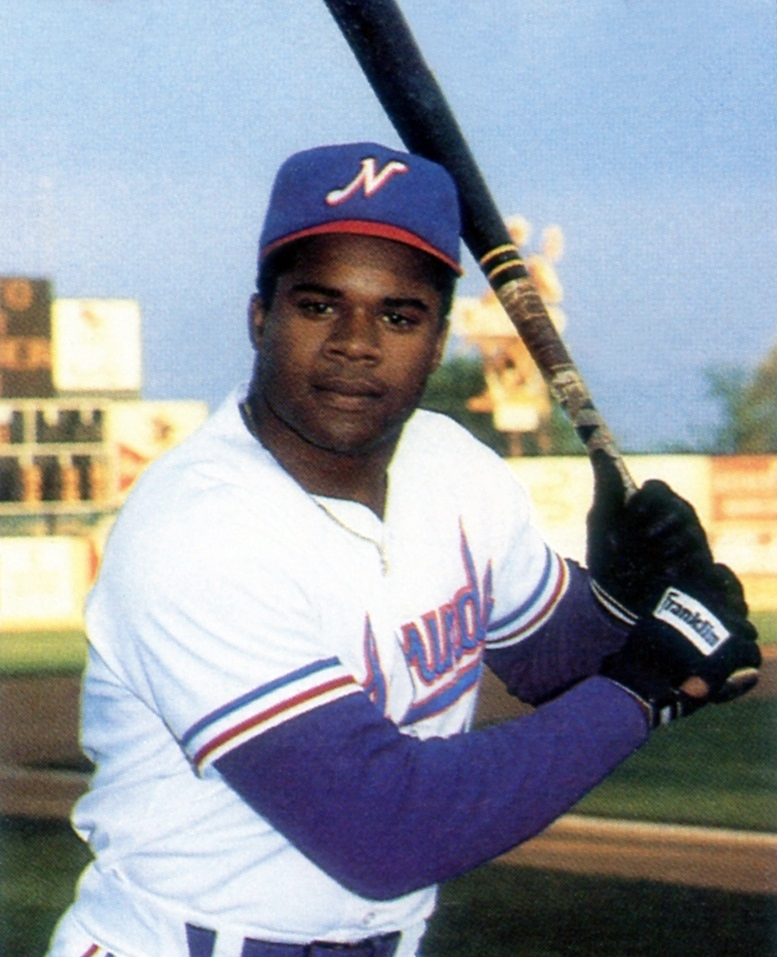
Lenny Harris, 1988 AA leader in stolen bases (45)

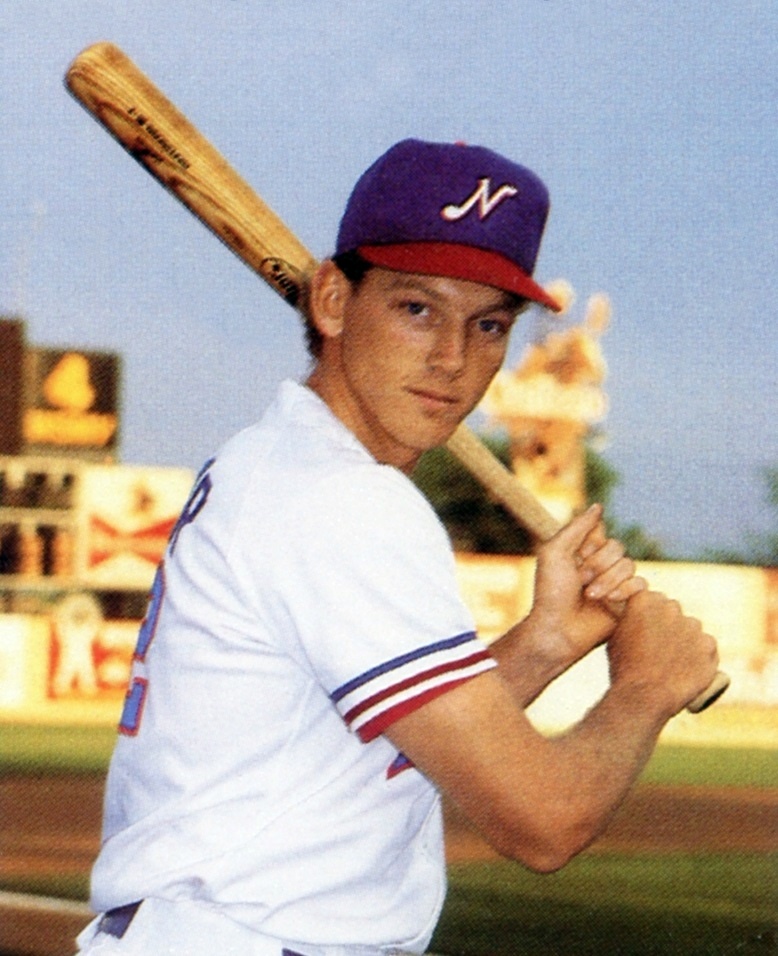
Van Snider, 1988 AA leader in home runs (23)

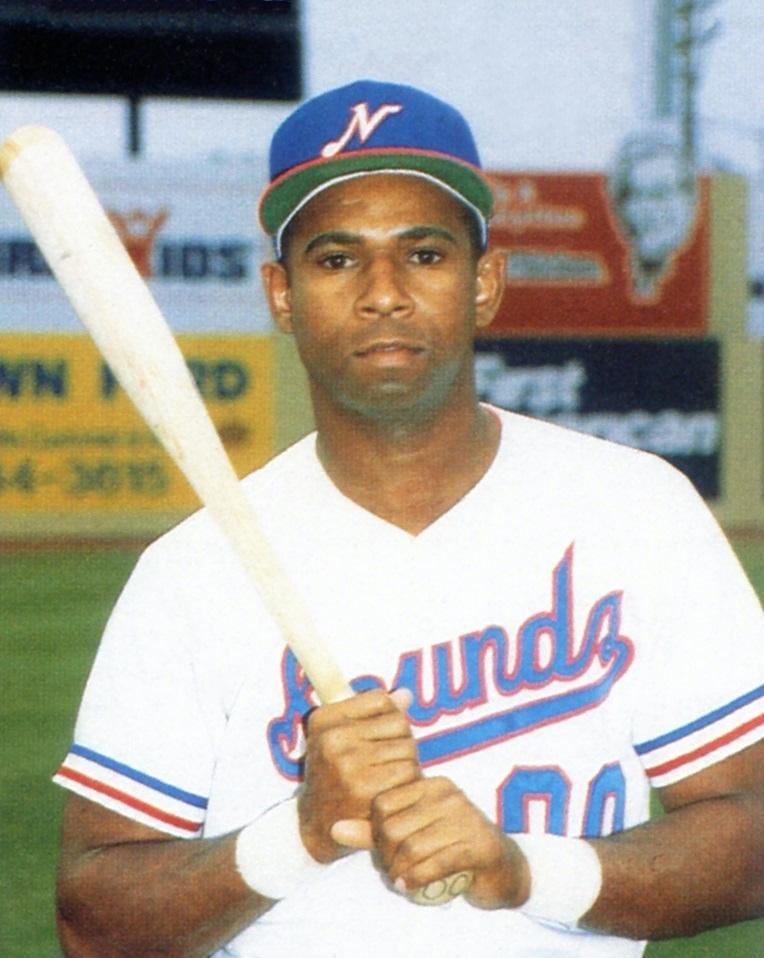
Skeeter Barnes, 1989 AA leader in doubles (39) and 1990 leader in hits (156)

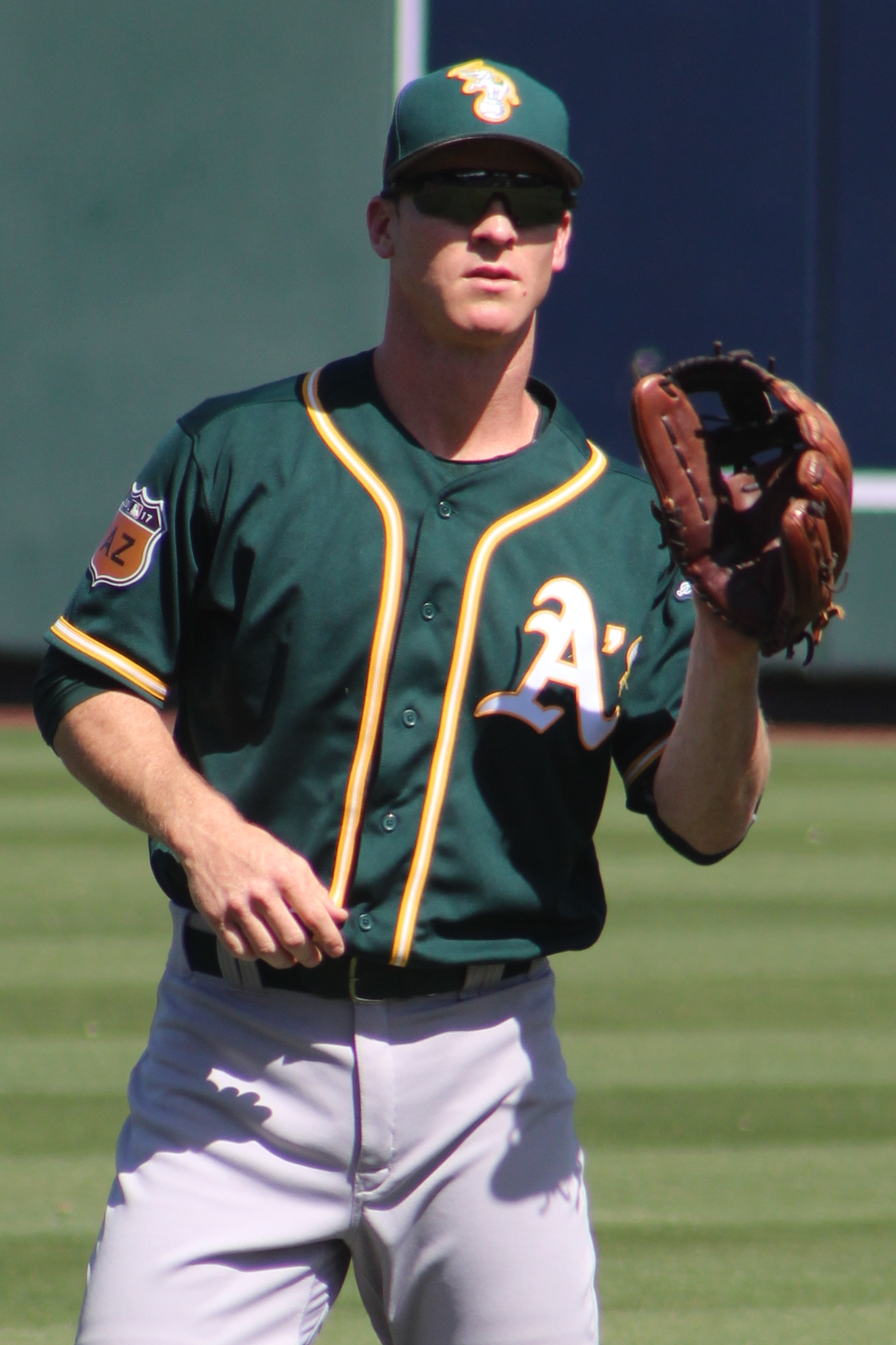
Joey Wendle, 2015 PCL leader in hits (167)

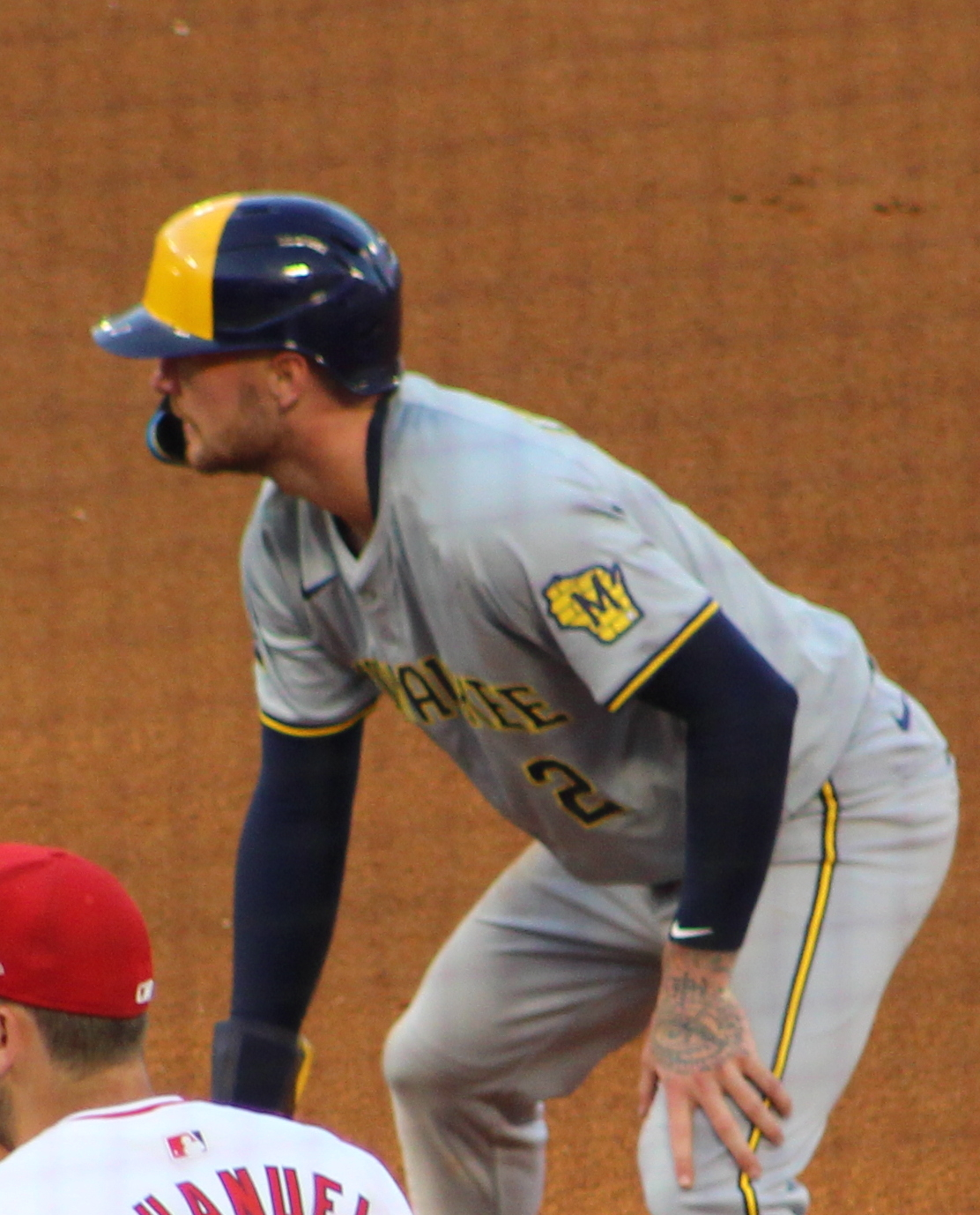
Brice Turang, 2022 IL co-leader in hits (152)

Individual batting leaders
Statistic	Player	Record	Season	Ref.
Games played	Gene Menees	145*^{(4)}	1979	
Games played	Skeeter Barnes	145*^{(4)}	1979	
Games played	Brian Dayett	144*^{(2)}	1982	
Games played	Germán Rivera	140*^{(2)}	1986	
Games played	Skeeter Barnes	144*^{(2)}	1990	
Games played	Norberto Martin	137*^{(2)}	1993	
Games played	Mike Robertson	139	1995	
Games played	Mike Robertson	138*^{(3)}	1996	
Games played	Kerry Valrie	138*^{(3)}	1996	
Plate appearances	Skeeter Barnes	615	1990	
Plate appearances	Norberto Martin	626	1993	
Plate appearances	Drew Denson	603	1994	
Plate appearances	Kerry Valrie	593	1995	
Plate appearances	Joey Wendle	618	2015	
At bats	Skeeter Barnes	548	1990	
At bats	Norberto Martin	580	1993	
At bats	Kerry Valrie	544	1995	
At bats	Joey Wendle	577	2015	
Runs	Steve Balboni	101	1980	
Runs	Ted Wilborn	106	1981	
Runs	Jeff Abbott	88	1997	
Hits	Buck Showalter	178	1980	
Hits	Buck Showalter	152	1982	
Hits	Skeeter Barnes	156	1990	
Hits	Norberto Martin	179	1993	
Hits	Magglio Ordóñez	172	1997	
Hits	Joey Wendle	167	2015	
Hits	Brice Turang	152*^{(3)}	2022	
Doubles	Don Mattingly	35	1981	
Doubles	Skeeter Barnes	39	1989	
Doubles	Trent Oeltjen	42	2010	
Doubles	Joey Wendle	42*^{(2)}	2015	
Triples	Duane Walker	15	1979	
Triples	Ted Wilborn	14	1980	
Triples	Van Snider	9*^{(3)}	1989	
Triples	Ray Durham	12*^{(2)}	1994	
Triples	Gary Thurman	12*^{(2)}	1994	
Triples	Tike Redman	10*^{(2)}	2001	
Triples	Rich Thompson	13	2004	
Triples	Jorge Mateo	16	2018	
Triples	Isaac Collins	7*^{(2)}	2024	
Home runs	Steve Balboni	34	1980	
Home runs	Dan Pasqua	33	1984	
Home runs	Van Snider	23	1988	
Home runs	Drew Denson	30	1994	
Home runs	J. J. Davis	26*^{(2)}	2003	
Runs batted in	Steve Balboni	122	1980	
Runs batted in	Drew Denson	103	1994	
Stolen bases	Lenny Harris	45	1988	
Stolen bases	Rich Thompson	40	2004	
Walks	Otis Nixon	110	1981	
Walks	Jon Singleton	117	2022	
Batting average	Scotti Madison	.341	1985	
Batting average	Bruce Fields	.368	1986	
Batting average	Matt Merullo	.332	1993	
Batting average	Magglio Ordóñez	.329*^{(2)}	1997	
On-base percentage	Scotti Madison	.423	1985	
On-base percentage	Mike Huff	.411	1993	
Slugging percentage	Steve Balboni	.553	1980	
Slugging percentage	Brian Dayett	.532	1982	
Slugging percentage	Scotti Madison	.590	1985	
Slugging percentage	Greg Norton	.534	1997	
Slugging percentage	J. J. Davis	.554	2003	
On-base plus slugging	Dan Pasqua	.877	1984	
On-base plus slugging	Scotti Madison	1.013	1985	
On-base plus slugging	Gerónimo Berroa	.929	1992	
Total bases	Steve Balboni	288	1980	
Total bases	Brian Dayett	285	1982	
Total bases	Van Snider	259	1988	
Total bases	Ray Durham	261	1994	
Total bases	Magglio Ordóñez	249*^{(2)}	1997	
Hit by pitch	Drew Denson	23	1993	
Hit by pitch	Drew Denson	35	1994	
Hit by pitch	Olmedo Sáenz	13*^{(2)}	1996	
Hit by pitch	Craig Wilson	25	2000	
Sacrifice hits	Gene Menees	18	1979	
Sacrifice hits	Keith Smith	17	1984	
Sacrifice hits	Scott Earl	12	1985	
Sacrifice hits	Max Venable	11	1987	
Sacrifice hits	Clemente Álvarez	12*^{(4)}	1994	
Sacrifice hits	Craig Wilson	12	1997	
Sacrifice hits	Alcides Escobar	19	2009	
Sacrifice flies	Don Mattingly	9*^{(3)}	1981	
Sacrifice flies	Mike Laga	7*^{(5)}	1985	
Sacrifice flies	Skeeter Barnes	8*^{(3)}	1989	
Sacrifice flies	Van Snider	8*^{(3)}	1989	
Sacrifice flies	Domingo Martínez	8*^{(2)}	1994	
Sacrifice flies	Magglio Ordóñez	9	1997	
Sacrifice flies	Iván Cruz	9*^{(3)}	1999	
Sacrifice flies	Jaycob Brugman	8	2016	
Intentional walks	Steve Balboni	17	1980	
Intentional walks	Leon Roberts	6*^{(2)}	1985	
Intentional walks	Van Snider	9*^{(2)}	1988	
Intentional walks	Andy Abad	6*^{(3)}	2007	

==== Pitching leaders ====
These pitchers led all other pitchers in their league with the best performance in distinct statistical pitching categories in a single season. A pitcher must have pitched at least as many innings as 80 percent of the number of scheduled regular-season games to qualify for the lead in earned run average or walks plus hits per inning pitched. To qualify for the lead in winning percentage, they must meet the preceding innings threshold and have any combination of wins and losses totaling at least ten.

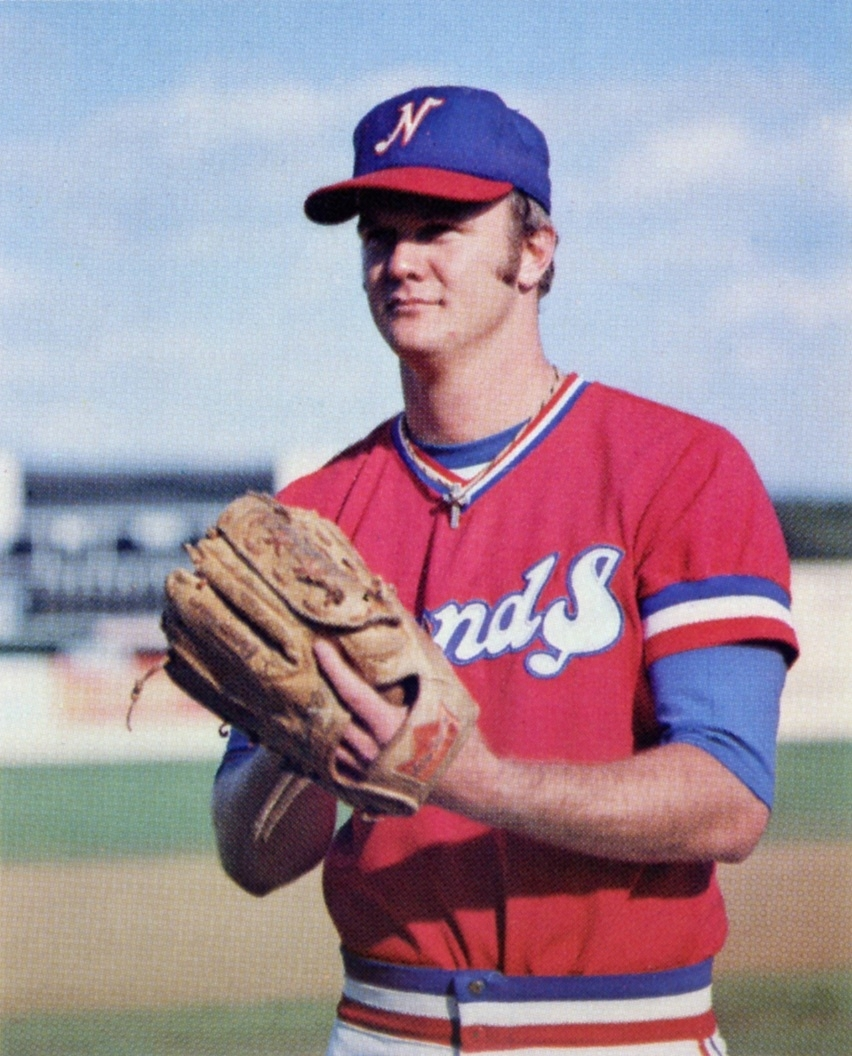
Scott Brown, 1979 SL leader in ERA (2.40) and WHIP (1.103)

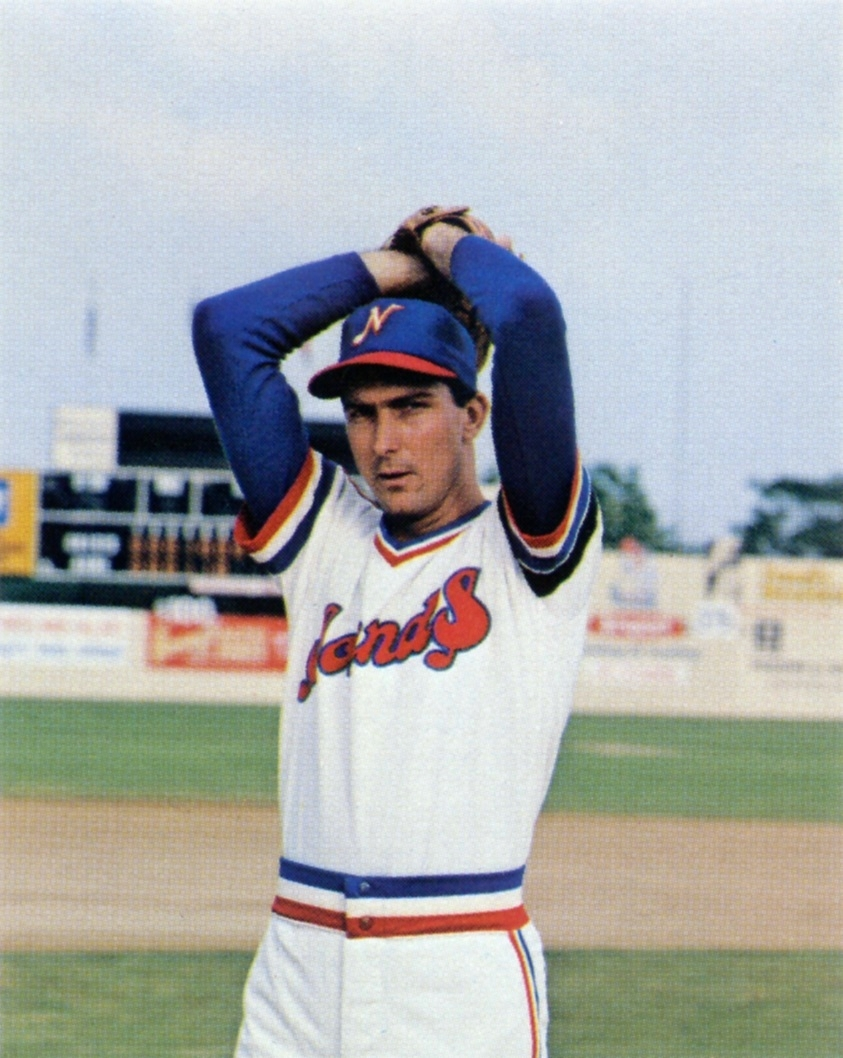
Andy McGaffigan, 1980 SL leader in ERA (2.38)

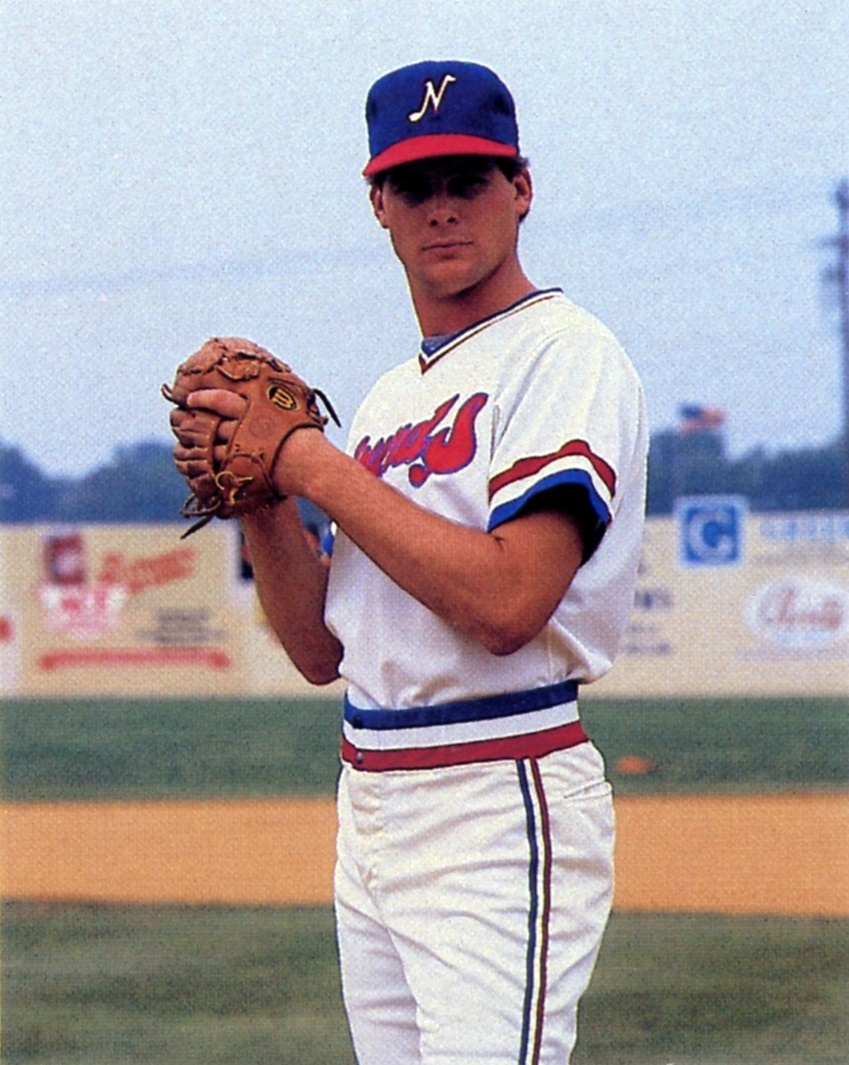
Clay Christiansen, 1982 SL co-leader in wins (16)

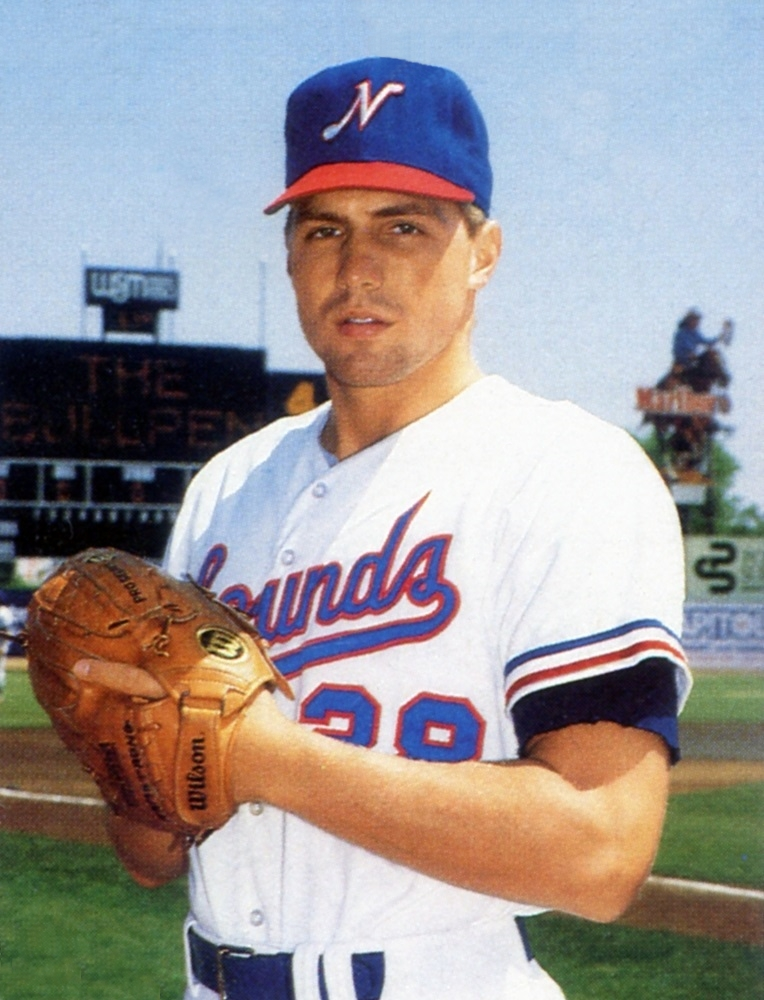
Jack Armstrong, 1988 AA leader in WHIP (1.017), 1989 leader in complete games (12) and shutouts (6), and 1989 co-leader in wins (13)

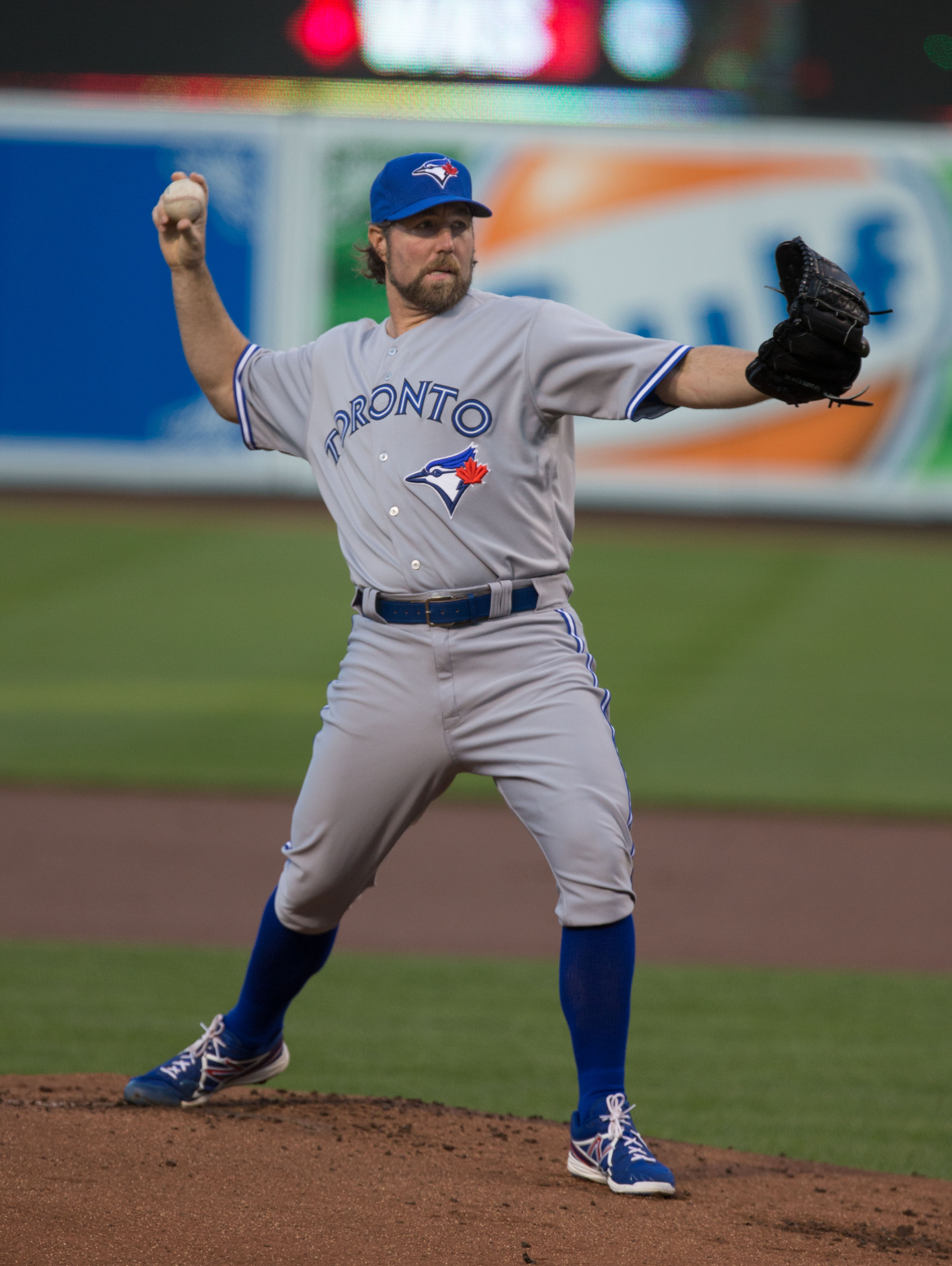
R. A. Dickey, 2007 PCL leader in wins (13) and co-leader in complete games (3)

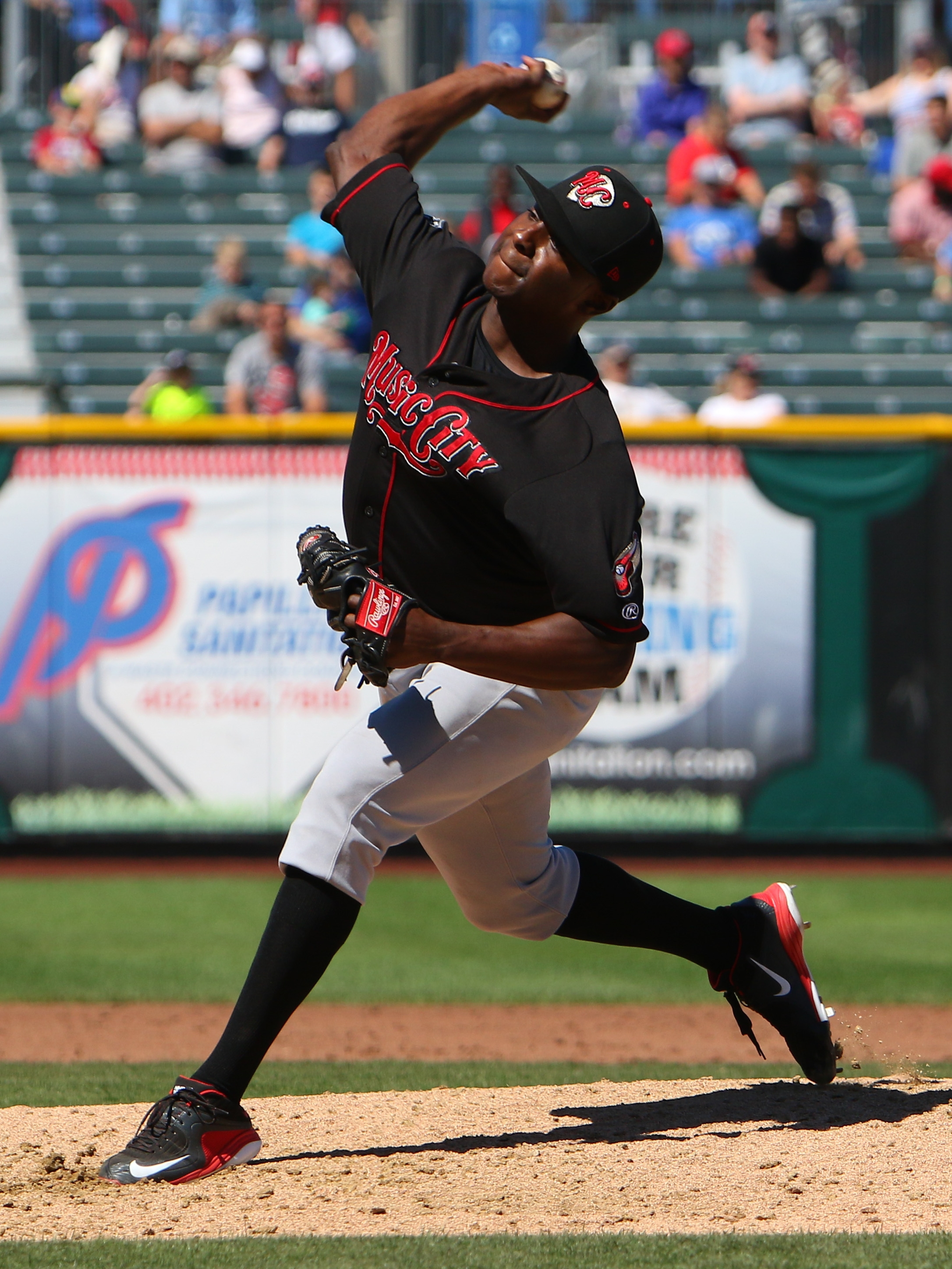
Jharel Cotton, 2016 PCL leader in strikeouts (155) and WHIP (1.084) and co-leader in shutouts (2)

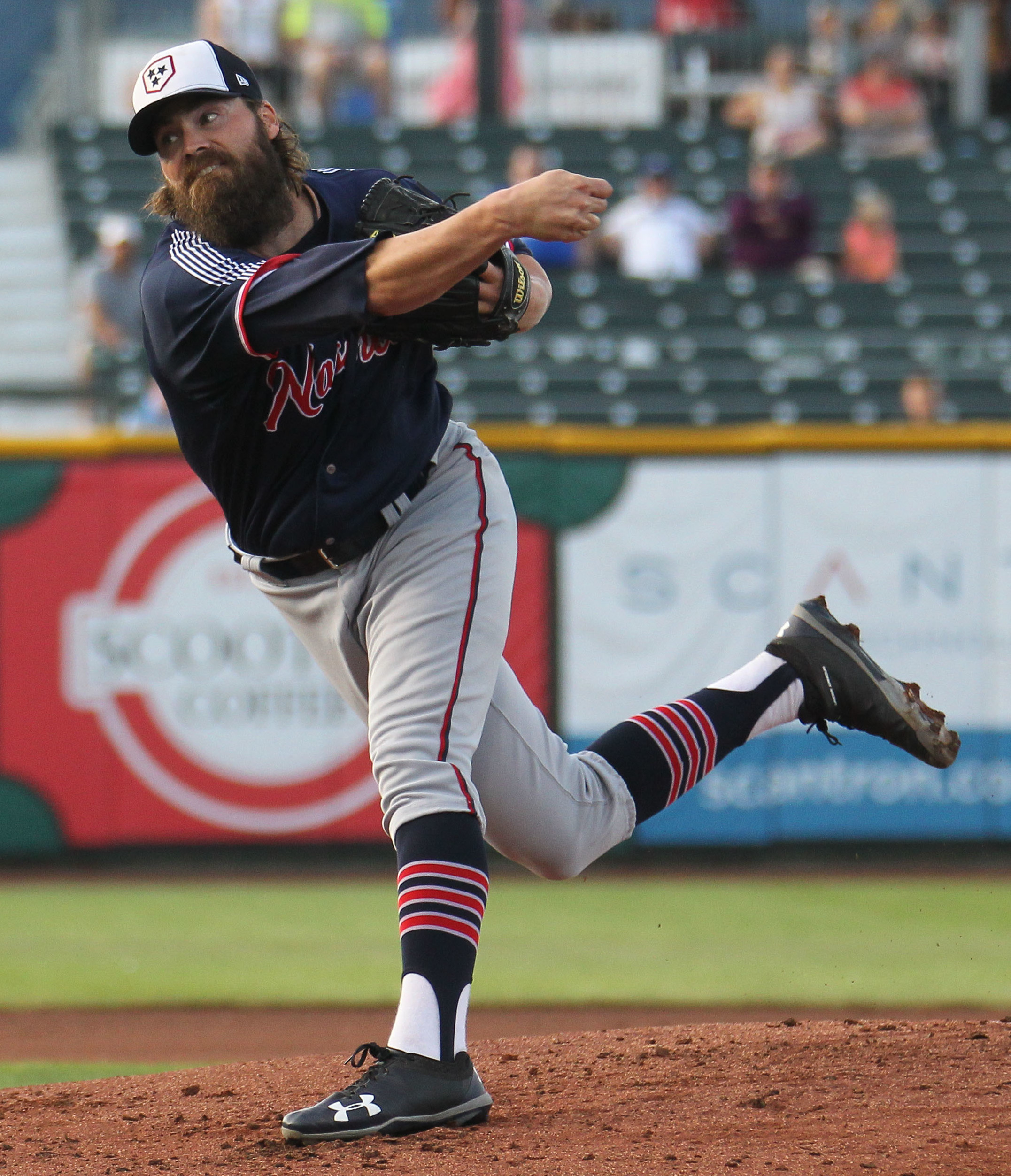
Tim Dillard, 2019 PCL leader in innings pitched (153 1/3)

Individual pitching leaders
Statistic	Player	Record	Season	Ref.
Wins	Clay Christiansen	16*^{(2)}	1982	
Wins	Stefan Wever	16*^{(2)}	1982	
Wins	Jack Armstrong	13*^{(4)}	1989	
Wins	Chris Hammond	15	1990	
Wins	Keith Brown	12*^{(5)}	1992	
Wins	Tim Pugh	12*^{(5)}	1992	
Wins	Scott Ruffcorn	15	1994	
Wins	Scott Ruffcorn	13	1996	
Wins	R. A. Dickey	13	2007	
Wins	Caleb Boushley	12*^{(2)}	2022	
Wins	Chad Patrick	14	2024	
Winning percentage	Greg Hughes	.733 (11–4)	1979	
Winning percentage	Pete Filson	.833 (10–2)*^{(2)}	1981	
Winning percentage	Chris Hammond	.938 (15–1)	1990	
Winning percentage	Rodney Bolton	.909 (10–1)	1993	
Winning percentage	Scott Ruffcorn	.833 (15–3)*^{(2)}	1994	
Winning percentage	Jimmy Anderson	.846 (11–2)	1999	
Winning percentage	Dave Williams	.750 (6–2)	2004	
Winning percentage	Rick Helling	.750 (9–3)	2005	
Winning percentage	Johnny Hellweg	.706 (12–5)	2013	
Winning percentage	Caleb Boushley	.857 (12–2)	2022	
Winning percentage	Robert Gasser	.900 (9–1)	2023	
Winning percentage	Chad Patrick	.933 (14–1)	2024	
Earned run average	Scott Brown	2.40	1979	
Earned run average	Andy McGaffigan	2.38	1980	
Earned run average	Stefan Wever	2.78	1982	
Earned run average	Chris Hammond	2.17	1990	
Earned run average	Rodney Bolton	2.88	1993	
Earned run average	Rodney Bolton	2.88	1995	
Earned run average	Jimmy Nelson	1.46	2014	
Earned run average	Chad Patrick	2.90	2024	
Games pitched	Geoff Combe	66	1978	
Games pitched	Raul Ferreyra	61	1979	
Games pitched	Dustin Molleken	54*^{(2)}	2014	
Games pitched	Luke Barker	53	2021	
Games started	Luis Vasquez	29	1989	
Games started	Rodney Imes	29*^{(2)}	1990	
Games started	Gino Minutelli	29	1992	
Games started	Tony McKnight	28*^{(6)}	2002	
Complete games	Jamie Werly	18	1981	
Complete games	Brian Denman	8*^{(3)}	1985	
Complete games	Scott Terry	10	1987	
Complete games	Jack Armstrong	12	1989	
Complete games	Bronson Arroyo	3*^{(3)}	2002	
Complete games	Nelson Figueroa	3*^{(4)}	2004	
Complete games	Jared Fernández	4	2006	
Complete games	R. A. Dickey	3*^{(2)}	2007	
Complete games	Zach Neal	2*^{(8)}	2015	
Complete games	Corey Walter	2	2017	
Complete games	Tim Dillard	1*^{(9)}	2019	
Shutouts	Kelly Scott	3*^{(6)}	1983	
Shutouts	Mark Shiflett	3*^{(6)}	1983	
Shutouts	Brian Denman	4	1985	
Shutouts	Jack Lazorko	2*^{(10)}	1986	
Shutouts	Jack Armstrong	6	1989	
Shutouts	Chris Hammond	3	1990	
Shutouts	Scott Ruffcorn	3*^{(2)}	1994	
Shutouts	Tom Fordham	2*^{(4)}	1996	
Shutouts	Bronson Arroyo	2*^{(3)}	2002	
Shutouts	Jared Fernández	2*^{(3)}	2006	
Shutouts	Mike Fiers	1*^{(9)}	2011	
Shutouts	Mike Fiers	1*^{(8)}	2012	
Shutouts	Mike Fiers	1*^{(13)}	2014	
Shutouts	Jharel Cotton	2*^{(2)}	2016	
Shutouts	James Naile	1*^{(7)}	2018	
Shutouts	Tyler Herb	1*^{(6)}	2022	
Shutouts	Thomas Pannone	1*^{(4)}	2026	
Saves	Geoff Combe	27	1979	
Saves	Randy Graham	17*^{(3)}	1984	
Saves	John Pacella	17	1986	
Saves	Mark Corey	30*^{(2)}	2003	
Saves	Chris Smith	26	2010	
Saves	David Carpenter	21	2019	
Saves	Luke Barker	13	2021	
Innings pitched	Jamie Werly	222	1981	
Innings pitched	Brian Denman	181 2/3*^{(2)}	1985	
Innings pitched	Scott Terry	181 2/3	1987	
Innings pitched	Tim Dillard	153 1/3	2019	
Strikeouts	Jay Howell	173	1978	
Strikeouts	Jamie Werly	193	1981	
Strikeouts	Stefan Wever	191	1982	
Strikeouts	Jack Lazorko	119	1986	
Strikeouts	Norm Charlton	161	1988	
Strikeouts	Chris Hammond	149	1990	
Strikeouts	James Baldwin	156	1994	
Strikeouts	Todd Van Poppel	157	1999	
Strikeouts	Jharel Cotton	155	2016	
Strikeouts	Robert Gasser	166	2023	
Strikeouts	Chad Patrick	145	2024	
Walks plus hits per inning pitched	Scott Brown	1.103	1979	
Walks plus hits per inning pitched	Jack Armstrong	1.017	1988	
Walks plus hits per inning pitched	Bronson Arroyo	1.077	2002	
Walks plus hits per inning pitched	Jimmy Nelson	0.919	2014	
Walks plus hits per inning pitched	Jharel Cotton	1.084	2016	
Walks plus hits per inning pitched	Chad Patrick	1.086	2024	

==== Fielding leaders ====
These players led all other players in their league with the highest fielding percentage at their playing position in a single season. To qualify as a leader, catchers must have participated at that position in at least half of scheduled regular-season games. Infielders and outfielders must have participated at their positions in at least two-thirds of scheduled regular-season games. Pitchers must have pitched as many innings as the number of scheduled regular-season games unless another pitcher has an equal or greater percentage with more total chances in fewer innings.

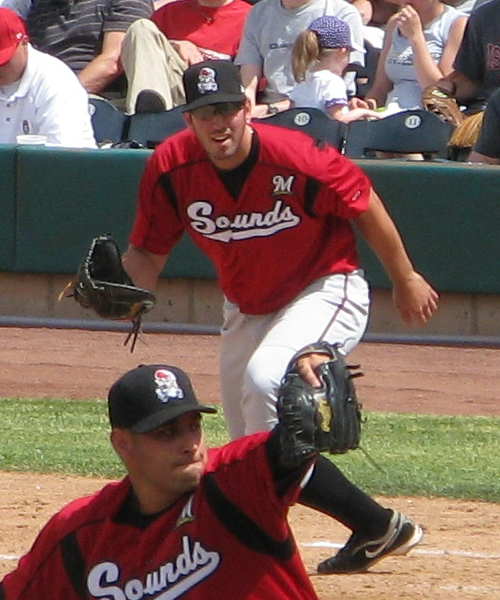
Joe Koshansky, 2009 PCL fielding percentage leader among first basemen (.997)

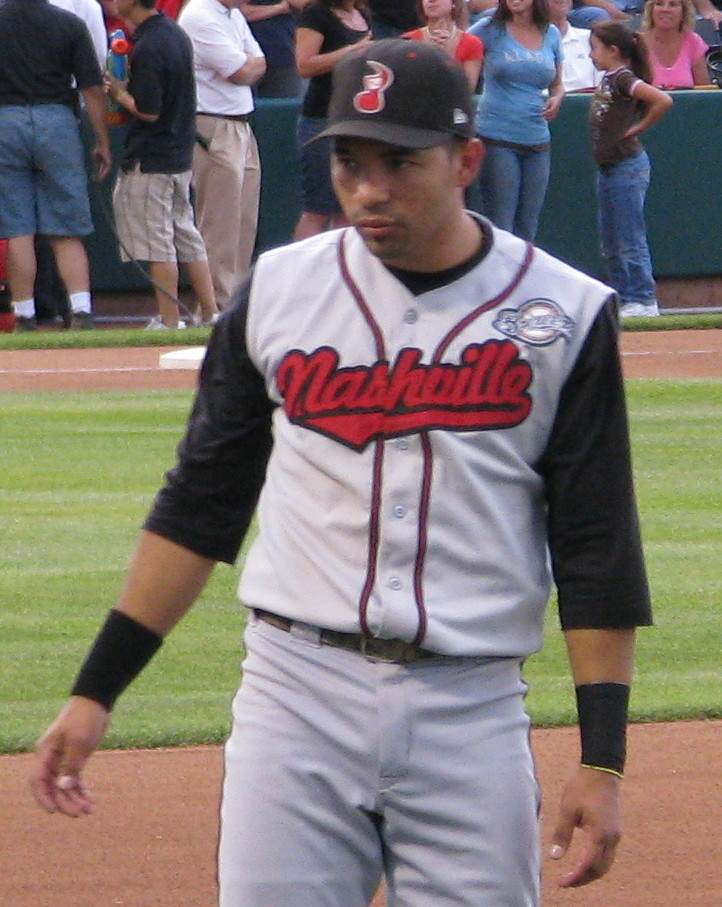
Hernán Iribarren, 2009 PCL fielding percentage leader among second basemen (.990)

Individual fielding leaders
Statistic	Player	Record	Season	Ref.
Fielding percentage, second baseman	Gene Menees	.977	1978	
Fielding percentage, outfielder	Paul Householder	.989	1979	
Fielding percentage, catcher	Dave Van Gorder	.992	1979	
Fielding percentage, first baseman	Steve Balboni	.990	1980	
Fielding percentage, pitcher	Clay Christiansen	1.000 (46 TC)*^{(2)}	1982	
Fielding percentage, third baseman	Mike Pagliarulo	.954	1983	
Fielding percentage, catcher	Clemente Álvarez	.998	1994	
Fielding percentage, second baseman	Ray Durham	.973	1994	
Fielding percentage, pitcher	Steve Schrenk	1.000 (45 TC)	1994	
Fielding percentage, second baseman	Doug Brady	.975	1995	
Fielding percentage, first baseman	Mike Robertson	.992	1995	
Fielding percentage, third baseman	Olmedo Sáenz	.939	1995	
Fielding percentage, first baseman	Mike Robertson	.996	1996	
Fielding percentage, outfielder	Jeff Abbott	1.000 (243 TC)	1997	
Fielding percentage, pitcher	Rich Pratt	1.000 (42 TC)	1997	
Fielding percentage, second baseman	Matt Howard	.982	1999	
Fielding percentage, second baseman	John Wehner	.984	2000	
Fielding percentage, outfielder	Ryan Radmanovich	.995	2001	
Fielding percentage, pitcher	Matt Guerrier	1.000 (46 TC)	2002	
Fielding percentage, pitcher	Pat Mahomes	1.000 (45 TC)	2004	
Fielding percentage, catcher	Keith McDonald	.997	2004	
Fielding percentage, catcher	Mike Rivera	.997	2007	
Fielding percentage, second baseman	Hernán Iribarren	.990	2009	
Fielding percentage, first baseman	Joe Koshansky	.997	2009	
Fielding percentage, second baseman	Eric Farris	.983	2011	
Fielding percentage, second baseman	Eric Farris	.988	2012	
Fielding percentage, outfielder	Jason Pridie	.993	2015	
Fielding percentage, second baseman	Joey Wendle	.986	2016	
Fielding percentage, pitcher	Caleb Boushley	1.000 (29 TC)*^{(2)}	2022	
Fielding percentage, pitcher	Josh Lindblom	1.000 (16 TC)*^{(2)}	2022	
Fielding percentage, pitcher	Carlos Rodríguez	1.000 (15 TC)	2024	

=== Team leaders ===
These Sounds teams led all other teams in their league with the best performance in distinct statistical categories in a single season.

==== General leaders ====
Team general leaders
Statistic	Season	Record	Ref.
Wins	1980	97	
Wins	1981	81	
Wins	1990	86*^{(2)}	
Wins	2007	89	
Wins	2016	83	
Wins	2022	91	
Losses	1980	46	
Losses	1981	62	
Losses	2007	55	
Losses	2016	59	
Losses	2022	58	
Winning percentage	1980	.678	
Winning percentage	1981	.566	
Winning percentage	2007	.618	
Winning percentage	2016	.585	
Winning percentage	2022	.611	

==== Batting leaders ====
Team batting leaders
Statistic	Season	Record	Ref.
Plate appearances	1980	5,538	
Plate appearances	1981	5,477*^{(2)}	
At bats	1980	4,837	
At bats	1982	4,836	
At bats	1992	4,976	
At bats	1995	4,906	
Runs	1980	753	
Runs	1993	731	
Hits	1980	1,345	
Hits	1982	1,271	
Hits	1993	1,362	
Hits	1997	1,292	
Hits	2022	1,346	
Doubles	1981	211*^{(2)}	
Doubles	1984	217	
Doubles	1989	250	
Triples	1979	60	
Triples	1980	60	
Triples	1981	58*^{(2)}	
Triples	2024	40	
Triples	2026	39	
Runs batted in	1980	668	
Runs batted in	1993	683	
Runs batted in	1997	659	
Stolen bases	1981	205	
Stolen bases	2003	186	
Stolen bases	2005	175	
Stolen bases	2006	196	
Stolen bases	2022	192	
Stolen bases	2025	316	
Caught stealing	1987	44	
Caught stealing	1989	30	
Caught stealing	2016	21	
Strikeouts	1987	666	
Strikeouts	1996	772	
Strikeouts	1999	855	
Batting average	1980	.278	
Batting average	1993	.281	
Batting average	1997	.269	
Batting average	2022	.268	
On-base percentage	1980	.356	
On-base percentage	1993	.350	
On-base percentage	2022	.355	
Slugging percentage	1984	.382	
On-base plus slugging	1980	.752*^{(2)}	
On-base plus slugging	1993	.787	
Total bases	1980	1,912	
Total bases	1982	1,911	
Total bases	1989	1,832	
Total bases	1993	2,117	
Double plays grounded into	1991	94	
Double plays grounded into	1994	96	
Double plays grounded into	2000	99	
Double plays grounded into	2001	89	
Double plays grounded into	2003	89	
Hit by pitch	1980	46	
Hit by pitch	1993	54	
Hit by pitch	1994	95	
Hit by pitch	2000	70	
Hit by pitch	2026	103	
Sacrifice hits	1979	83	
Sacrifice hits	1981	60	
Sacrifice hits	1987	42	
Sacrifice hits	1988	61	
Sacrifice hits	1990	67	
Sacrifice hits	2002	61	
Sacrifice hits	2009	92	
Sacrifice hits	2010	87	
Sacrifice hits	2011	80	
Sacrifice flies	1986	54	
Sacrifice flies	1989	47*^{(3)}	
Intentional walks	1979	48	
Intentional walks	1980	38	
Intentional walks	2004	28	
Intentional walks	2007	24	
Intentional walks	2009	28	

==== Pitching leaders ====
Team pitching leaders
Statistic	Season	Record	Ref.
Earned run average	1979	3.38	
Earned run average	1980	3.11	
Earned run average	1981	3.26	
Earned run average	1987	4.27	
Earned run average	1993	3.88	
Earned run average	1994	3.53	
Earned run average	2006	3.62	
Earned run average	2007	3.57	
Earned run average	2014	3.85	
Earned run average	2016	3.42	
Earned run average	2023	4.49	
Complete games	1981	54	
Complete games	1983	63	
Complete games	1987	19*^{(2)}	
Complete games	1990	22	
Complete games	1996	13	
Complete games	2002	10	
Complete games	2006	8*^{(2)}	
Complete games	2007	7	
Complete games	2013	4*^{(2)}	
Shutouts	1983	13	
Shutouts	1989	17	
Shutouts	1990	17	
Shutouts	1995	11	
Shutouts	2003	16	
Shutouts	2006	12*^{(3)}	
Shutouts	2007	11	
Shutouts	2012	12*^{(2)}	
Saves	1979	41	
Saves	1984	43	
Saves	1999	43*^{(3)}	
Innings pitched	1982	1,259	
Innings pitched	1987	1,219	
Innings pitched	1988	1,269	
Innings pitched	1992	1,295	
Innings pitched	1995	1,276 2/3	
Hits allowed	1980	1,094	
Hits allowed	1990	1,146	
Hits allowed	1991	1,132	
Hits allowed	1993	1,182	
Hits allowed	1994	1,224	
Hits allowed	1996	1,167	
Hits allowed	2003	1,198	
Hits allowed	2006	1,188	
Hits allowed	2007	1,171	
Hits allowed	2014	1,136	
Hits allowed	2016	1,130	
Hits allowed	2024	1,157	
Runs allowed	1980	544	
Runs allowed	1981	574	
Runs allowed	2006	594	
Runs allowed	1983	605*^{(2)}	
Runs allowed	1993	631	
Runs allowed	1994	587	
Runs allowed	2007	547	
Runs allowed	2014	587	
Runs allowed	2016	533	
Earned runs allowed	1979	460	
Earned runs allowed	1980	432	
Earned runs allowed	1981	443	
Earned runs allowed	1983	491	
Earned runs allowed	1993	539	
Earned runs allowed	1994	502	
Earned runs allowed	2006	513	
Earned runs allowed	2007	503	
Earned runs allowed	2014	526	
Earned runs allowed	2016	476	
Earned runs allowed	2023	640	
Home runs allowed	1980	72	
Home runs allowed	1981	77	
Home runs allowed	1994	94	
Home runs allowed	2007	118	
Home runs allowed	2011	125	
Home runs allowed	2014	101	
Home runs allowed	2016	93	
Home runs allowed	2017	102	
Home runs allowed	2023	143*^{(2)}	
Home runs allowed	2024	140	
Home runs allowed	2026	126	
Walks	1979	429	
Walks	1983	488	
Walks	2002	356	
Walks	2018	374	
Walks	2023	536	
Walks	2026	557	
Intentional walks	1983	11	
Intentional walks	1990	16	
Intentional walks	2018	3*^{(2)}	
Intentional walks	2026	2*^{(4)}	
Strikeouts	1992	1,033	
Strikeouts	1995	931	
Strikeouts	2002	1,080	
Strikeouts	2003	1,030	
Strikeouts	2007	1,148	
Strikeouts	2014	1,236	
Hit by pitch	1979	15	
Hit by pitch	1988	22*^{(2)}	
Hit by pitch	1989	28	
Hit by pitch	1990	30	
Hit by pitch	1995	40*^{(2)}	
Hit by pitch	1996	38	
Balks	1986	10	
Balks	1996	3	
Balks	1999	3*^{(3)}	
Balks	2002	4*^{(4)}	
Balks	2006	2*^{(2)}	
Balks	2010	3*^{(5)}	
Wild pitches	1990	49	
Wild pitches	2003	40*^{(2)}	
Wild pitches	2004	43	
Strikeouts	1980	922	
Strikeouts	1994	1,041	
Walks plus hits per inning pitched	1979	1.322	
Walks plus hits per inning pitched	1980	1.296	
Walks plus hits per inning pitched	1981	1.337	
Walks plus hits per inning pitched	1983	1.351	
Walks plus hits per inning pitched	1993	1.304	
Walks plus hits per inning pitched	2003	1.270	
Walks plus hits per inning pitched	2006	1.301	
Walks plus hits per inning pitched	2007	1.278	
Walks plus hits per inning pitched	2014	1.317	
Walks plus hits per inning pitched	2016	1.239	
Walks plus hits per inning pitched	2023	1.411	

==== Fielding leaders ====
Team fielding leaders
Statistic	Season	Record	Ref.
Putouts	1982	3,777	
Putouts	1987	3,657	
Putouts	1988	3,807	
Putouts	1992	3,885	
Putouts	1995	3,830	
Assists	1982	1,657	
Assists	1995	1,600	
Assists	2001	1,533	
Assists	2010	1,642	
Errors	2002	106*^{(2)}	
Errors	2006	100	
Errors	2007	86	
Errors	2012	89	
Errors	2022	78	
Double plays	1982	135*^{(2)}	
Fielding percentage	2002	.980	
Fielding percentage	2006	.982	
Fielding percentage	2007	.984	
Fielding percentage	2012	.983	
Fielding percentage	2022	.985	
Passed balls	1979	9	
Passed balls	1984	10	
Passed balls	1985	4	
Passed balls	1992	9	
Passed balls	2011	5*^{(2)}	
Passed balls	2021	4	
Stolen bases	2011	90	
Caught stealing	1996	70	
Caught stealing	1997	66	
