= List of Nashville Sounds broadcasters =

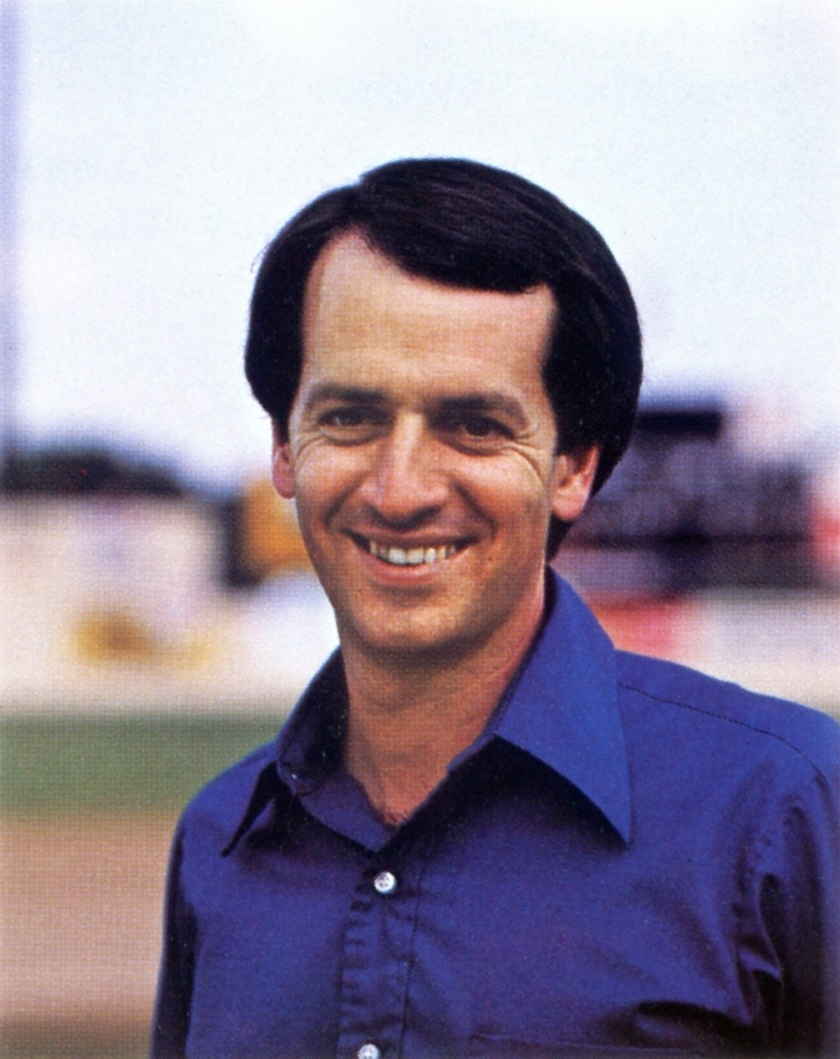
Bob Jamison, announcer from 1979 to 1990, won the Southern League Broadcaster of the Year Award in 1980 and 1982.

The Nashville Sounds Minor League Baseball team has played in Nashville, Tennessee, since being established in 1978 as an expansion team of the Double-A Southern League. They moved up to Triple-A in 1985 as members of the American Association before joining the Pacific Coast League in 1998. In 2021, they were placed in the Triple-A East, which became the International League in 2022. The team has employed seven play-by-play announcers who have provided running commentary for their games' radio broadcasts on fourteen radio stations throughout their history. Jeff Hem, the longest-tenured lead broadcaster in team history, has been the "Voice of the Sounds" since 2012.

As of 2026, all Sounds home and road games are broadcast on WBUZ-HD3 94.9 FM (AM 830). Live audio broadcasts are also available online through the team's website and the MiLB First Pitch app. Games can be viewed through the MiLB.TV subscription feature of the official website of Minor League Baseball, with audio provided by a radio simulcast.

== History ==
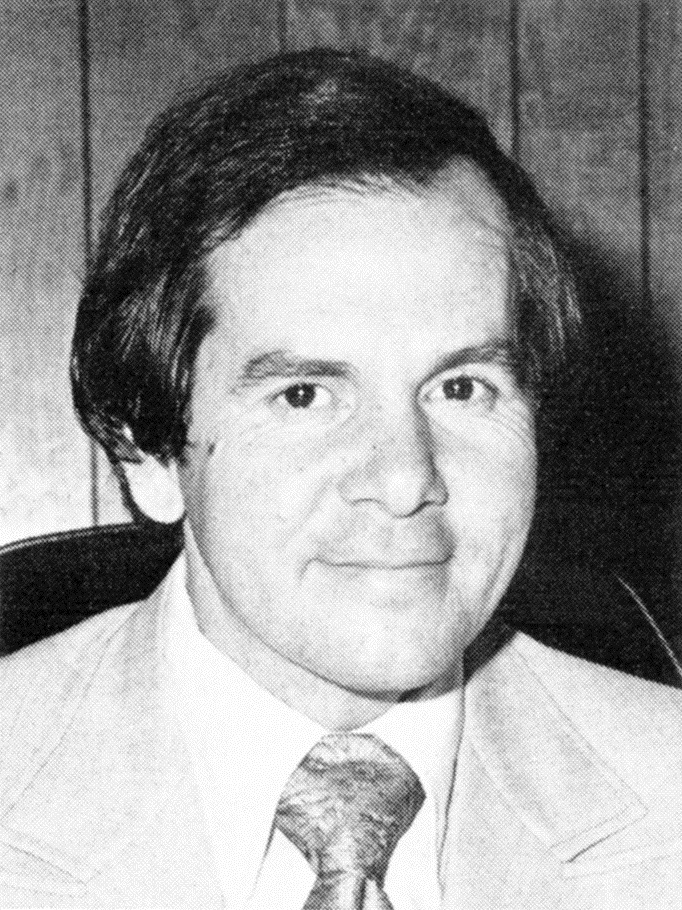
Monte Hale was the voice of the Sounds' inaugural 1978 season.

During the inaugural 1978 season, Nashville Sounds games were broadcast on WMTS by station owner Monte Hale, who also called football and basketball games for the Middle Tennessee Blue Raiders. WMTS, located some 30 miles (48 km) away from Nashville in Murfreesboro, was selected because it was the only station to make a firm offer to purchase broadcasting rights. The team and station received numerous complaints from listeners who were unable to pick up the signal in Nashville and surrounding communities. In response, the team switched to WKDA, which had wider reception, in 1979. This was the first of many such times the team would switch stations to either broaden the reach of their broadcasts or for business reasons. Along with a new station for 1979, Bob Jamison of the International League's Richmond Braves was hired to call games. He was behind the microphone for Nashville's 1979 and 1982 Southern League championship seasons. In 1980 and 1982, Jamison was recognized as the Southern League Broadcaster of the Year. He was also chosen to represent the American Association on the 1990 Triple-A All-Star Game broadcast team. Jamison served as the Sounds' play-by-play voice for 12 years until being hired to fill the same role with Major League Baseball's California Angels in 1991.

The announcer's seat was then filled by Steve Carroll, who had spent the previous three seasons with the Southern League's Huntsville Stars. He helped call the 1994 Triple-A All-Star Game, which was held at Nashville's Herschel Greer Stadium. Carroll left to become the radio voice of the National Hockey League's Philadelphia Flyers after the 1995 campaign. Steve Selby, another former Huntsville announcer, moved up to Nashville in 1996. Chuck Valenches, formerly an assistant broadcaster with Selby over the two previous seasons and of the Southern League's Jacksonville Suns for two years prior to that, was promoted to the lead role in 2000. He was the Pacific Coast League's representative on the 2001 Triple-A All-Star Game broadcast team. Valenches called the Sounds' 2005 Pacific Coast League championship season as well as two perfect games by Nashville pitchers: one by John Wasdin in 2003 and one by Manny Parra in 2007. Stu Paul, who had been with the Texas League's San Antonio Missions for nine seasons, was hired to call games beginning in 2010. Jeff Hem became the team's play-by-play announcer in 2012 after serving in the same capacity with the Midwest League's Kane County Cougars for seven years. He was on the call for the Sounds' final season at Greer Stadium in 2014 and their first season at First Tennessee Park in 2015.

From 1978 to 1999, games were sporadically televised in the Nashville market. The first game to be shown live from Greer was the September 1, 1978, inaugural season home finale on WDCN. In 1979, five road games were scheduled for broadcast on WNGE. From 1982 to 1992, games occasionally aired on WZTV, including ten games in 1983 and 1984, eight games in 1987, and four games in 1988. WNPX broadcast five games in 1999. Excluding the 1979 season, when play-by-play commentary was handled by Dick Palmer, the Sounds' radio announcers also provided television commentary.

== Announcers and stations ==
Announcers and stations
| Season | Play-by-play announcer | Radio station | Television station | Ref(s). |
|---|---|---|---|---|
| 1978 | Monte Hale | WMTS | WDCN | |
| 1979 | Bob Jamison | WKDA | WNGE (Note: Dick Palmer provided play-by-play for 1979 telecasts.) | |
| 1980 | Bob Jamison | WKDA | — | |
| 1981 | Bob Jamison | WKDA | — | |
| 1982 | Bob Jamison | WKDA | — | |
| 1983 | Bob Jamison | WLAC | WZTV | |
| 1984 | Bob Jamison | WSIX | WZTV | |
| 1985 | Bob Jamison | WSIX | WZTV | |
| 1986 | Bob Jamison | WSIX | WZTV | |
| 1987 | Bob Jamison | WSIX | WZTV | |
| 1988 | Bob Jamison | WKDA | WZTV | |
| 1989 | Bob Jamison | WRLT | — | |
| 1990 | Bob Jamison | WSIX | — | |
| 1991 | Steve Carroll | WWTN | — | |
| 1992 | Steve Carroll | WWTN | — | |
| 1993 | Steve Carroll | WWTN | — | |
| 1994 | Steve Carroll | WWTN | — | |
| 1995 | Steve Carroll | WAMB | — | |
| 1996 | Steve Selby | WAMB | — | |
| 1997 | Steve Selby | WAMB | — | |
| 1998 | Steve Selby | WYOR | — | |
| 1999 | Steve Selby | WNSR | WNPX | |
| 2000 | Chuck Valenches | WNSR | — | |
| 2001 | Chuck Valenches | WNSR | — | |
| 2002 | Chuck Valenches | WANT | — | |
| 2003 | Chuck Valenches | WANT | — | |
| 2004 | Chuck Valenches | WANT | — | |
| 2005 | Chuck Valenches | WAMB | — | |
| 2006 | Chuck Valenches | WNSR | — | |
| 2007 | Chuck Valenches | WNSR | — | |
| 2008 | Chuck Valenches | WNSR | — | |
| 2009 | Chuck Valenches | WNSR | — | |
| 2010 | Stu Paul | WGFX | — | |
| 2011 | Stu Paul | WGFX | — | |
| 2012 | Jeff Hem | WPRT | — | |
| 2013 | Jeff Hem | WPRT | — | |
| 2014 | Jeff Hem | WPRT | — | |
| 2015 | Jeff Hem | WPRT | — | |
| 2016 | Jeff Hem | WPRT | — | |
| 2017 | Jeff Hem | WNRQ-HD2 | — | |
| 2018 | Jeff Hem | WNRQ-HD2 | — | |
| 2019 | Jeff Hem | WNRQ-HD2 | — | |
| 2020 | Jeff Hem | — (Note: The 2020 season was cancelled due to the COVID-19 pandemic. No announcement had been made regarding the season's radio station.) | — | |
| 2021 | Jeff Hem | WBUZ-HD3 | — | |
| 2022 | Jeff Hem | WBUZ-HD3 | — | |
| 2023 | Jeff Hem | WBUZ-HD3 | — | |
| 2024 | Jeff Hem | WBUZ-HD3 | — | |
| 2025 | Jeff Hem | WBUZ-HD3 | — | |
| 2026 | Jeff Hem | WBUZ-HD3 | — | |
