= WMGC =

WMGC may refer to:

- WMGC (AM), a radio station (810 AM) licensed to Murfreesboro, Tennessee, United States
- WMGC-FM, a radio station (105.1 FM) licensed to Detroit, Michigan, United States
- WMGC-TV, the former callsign of WIVT, a television station (channel 34 analog/34 digital) licensed to Binghamton, New York, United States
