= Murphy Center =

Arena in Murfreesboro, Tennessee, U.S.

- The Glass House
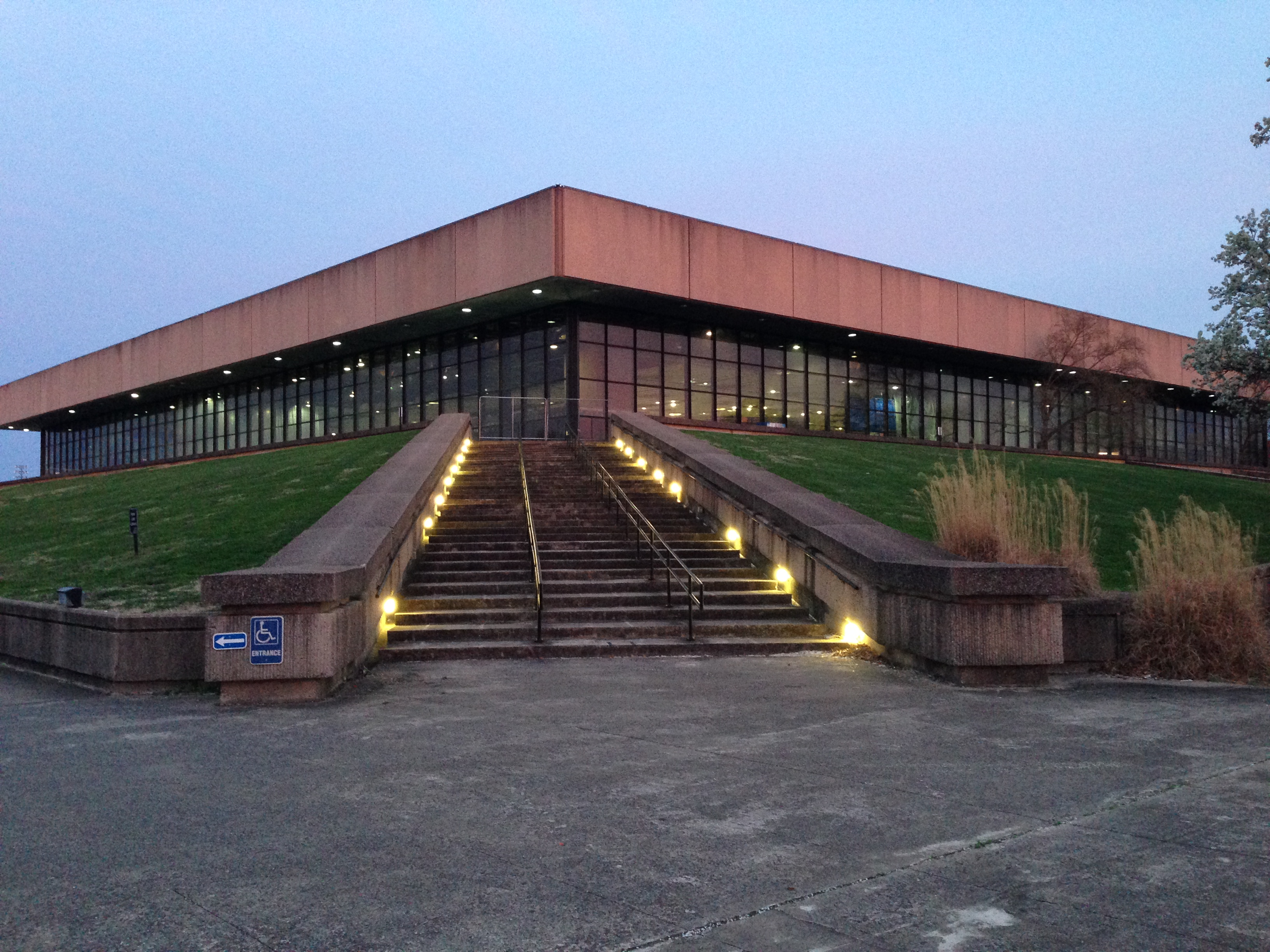
- The northwest side of Murphy Center, as viewed from Middle Tennessee Boulevard
- Interactive map of Murphy Center
- Location: 2650 Middle Tennessee Blvd, Murfreesboro, Tennessee, U.S. 37132
- Coordinates: 35°51′8.88″N 86°22′11.29″W
- Owner: Middle Tennessee State University
- Operator: Middle Tennessee State University
- Capacity: 11,520
- Surface: Hardwood
- Record attendance: 11,807 (02-26-2004 vs. Western Kentucky)

Construction
- Built: 1971-72
- Opened: December 11, 1972
- Renovated: 2014
- Cost: $6.5 million ($51.7 million adjusted for inflation)

Tenant
- Middle Tennessee Blue Raiders (NCAA) (1972–present)

Charles M. Murphy Athletic Center (commonly known as the Murphy Center) is the name of the main athletic department building at Middle Tennessee State University in Murfreesboro, Tennessee, United States. The building opened December 11, 1972, and is named in honor of former athletics director Charles M. "Bubber" Murphy, a standout athlete at the college in the 1930s, who also served as head coach of Middle Tennessee State's football (1947–1968), basketball (1948–1949), and baseball (1951, 1953–1955) programs.

Located on the northwest edge of MTSU's campus, adjacent to Johnny "Red" Floyd Stadium, Murphy Center houses most of the university's athletics offices, some classroom space, multiple practice gymnasiums, training rooms, locker rooms, weight rooms, dance studios, racquetball courts and,most notably, the 11,520-seat multi-purpose Monte Hale/Jimmy Earle Arena. The building's campus abbreviation is MC.

Though the building appears to sit atop a hill, it is actually two levels high, with most of the first floor situated behind a berm. The first level contains Murphy Center's offices and facilities, which are positioned in a square under the arena's seating bowl. The arena floor itself is also on the first level, and is accessible from any of four vomitories. The main arena concourse makes up the second level, which is entirely above ground, and its exterior walls are composed completely of windows and metal frames. As a result, Murphy Center has earned the nickname "The Glass House". During the day, the interior of the arena is bathed with natural sunlight, so much so that a curtain was installed on the western side of the building to prevent glare during afternoon events. The bleacher sections on the concourse also help to shield the arena floor from the light.

== Monte Hale/Jimmy Earle Arena ==
Monte Hale/Jimmy Earle Arena is home to the MTSU Blue Raiders men's and women's basketball teams, and features a bowl of permanent box seats around the basketball floor and 17 (originally 18) sections of retractable bleachers on the concourse above the bowl. The bleachers usually remain in their retracted state and are only opened for events in which the expected attendance is larger than the bowl of box seats will allow. The arena's seating structure is designed to be identical to the original configuration of the Joyce Center at the University of Notre Dame.

The arena itself is named in memory of Monte Hale, MTSU Athletics' radio play-by-play voice from 1961 to 1981. In 2020, an additional dedication was made to honor Jimmy Earle, MTSU's head Men's Basketball coach from 1969 to 1979. The arena's official name is displayed prominently on a press box, although it is most often simply called "Murphy Center", the name of the building that houses it.

=== Basketball ===
The first basketball game at Murphy Center featured the MTSU men's team hosting Vanderbilt on the arena's opening night. The Commodores defeated the Blue Raiders 69–57.

Murphy Center has hosted many basketball games, a few of which have been sold out. The largest crowd ever to witness a game on the hardwood of Monte Hale Arena was 11,807 on February 26, 2004, when the Blue Raiders defeated the WKU Hilltoppers 73–59. Other sold out sporting events include the women's basketball team's game on November 25, 2009, against the Tennessee Lady Vols. A crowd of 11,802 witnessed a close game but UT victory, 69–52.

The arena has hosted the Ohio Valley Conference men's basketball tournament three times: 1975, 1985 and 1987. It hosted the Sun Belt Conference men's and women's basketball tournaments in 2006.

Monte Hale Arena also serves as home to the Tennessee Secondary School Athletic Association's (TSSAA) boys' and girls' Division I state high school basketball championships each March.

=== Volleyball ===
Select matches of the 2010 Sun Belt Conference Volleyball Tournament were held inside Murphy Center.

The final matches of the TSSAA volleyball championships are held inside Murphy Center each October.

The Lady Raiders volleyball team staged matches in Murphy Center until 2002, when the program moved to the neighboring Alumni Memorial Gymnasium.

=== Indoor track and field ===
When the bleachers are retracted, the upper concourse of the arena can also serve as an indoor track and field facility. The texture of the concourse's floor is designed to accommodate such events, and the lines for the running lanes are permanently painted onto the floor. Murphy Center has been home to 24 total Ohio Valley and Sun Belt Conference Indoor Championships.

Murphy Center is also known for the creation of NCAA Indoor Last Chance Meets. In 1976, MTSU track and field head coach Dean Hayes got together with several other coaches looking for one final opportunity for their athletes to qualify for the NCAA Indoor Championships. The coaches held a meet at Murphy Center the week before the nationals, that would later go on to be known as NCAA Last Chance Meets. Today, there are at least six Last Chance Meets around the nation, including in Ames, Iowa (Iowa State), South Bend, Indiana (Notre Dame), Blacksburg, Virginia (Virginia Tech), Lincoln, Nebraska (Nebraska), Fayetteville, Arkansas (Arkansas), and Gainesville, Florida (Florida).

=== Music venue ===
Especially during the 1970s and 1980s, but even through the late 1990s, Murphy Center was one of the Nashville area's premier concert venues, having the largest capacity of any suitable indoor facility in the region. Notably, Elvis Presley played a series of five sold-out shows in the arena in 1974 and 1975. Bruce Springsteen and the E Street Band played a concert on December 9, 1984 as part of the Born in the U.S.A. Tour. U2 played the center in 1987 to a sold-out crowd as part of their Joshua Tree Tour. On February 20, 1989, Bon Jovi played to a sold-out, standing room-only crowd during their New Jersey Syndicate Tour. However, the frequency and notability of concerts began to drop as trends changed. Large touring shows became more elaborate and demanded larger and more modern venues, such as the Starwood Amphitheatre in Antioch (built in 1985, closed in 2006) and the Bridgestone Arena in Nashville (built in 1996). Occasional concerts are still staged at Murphy Center, although they are typically geared toward the MTSU student body and feature lower-tier artists that draw smaller crowds. In 1991, Murphy Center gained notability as the site of the Judds' farewell concert as regular touring act, although they have since performed several shows together. Portions of Garth Brooks' 1992 NBC television special, This Is Garth Brooks, were also filmed at Murphy Center.

=== Convocations ===
Monte Hale Arena inside Murphy Center is used for occasional convocations of MTSU students, including CUSTOMS events for incoming freshmen and transfers. Homecoming week festivities and student-oriented concerts are also held inside the arena.

MTSU's graduation ceremonies take place at Murphy Center each May, August, and December. Several area high schools also regularly use Murphy Center to host graduation ceremonies.

== History ==
The idea of a new arena for then-Middle Tennessee State College was conceptualized by school President Quill E. Cope in the early 1960s, as a response to MTSC's growth. Crowds for basketball games were getting too large for Memorial Gymnasium (now Alumni Memorial Gymnasium) to hold. Original plans had called for a 7,500-seat basketball-only facility and a separate building for the athletic department offices and field sports. When Cope retired in 1967, new University President Mel Scarlett combined the two concepts into one facility and envisioned a larger arena that could accommodate sports and other events, with a side benefit being the ability to move graduation ceremonies indoors. An architect was hired in 1968, construction began on Murphy Center in 1971, and the building opened on December 11, 1972.

In April 2012, the retractable bleachers in Section D were destroyed when the retraction motor malfunctioned and caused the structure to collapse. The arena was not in use at the time and no one was injured. As of January 2019, the section of bleachers has not been replaced. After the incident, the remaining 17 bleacher sections passed inspection and showed no further issues, but as a precautionary measure, their motors were replaced later that year. In a 2011 interview with The Daily News Journal, MTSU Athletics Director Chris Massaro envisioned a new indoor track facility elsewhere on campus that would allow the bleachers to be removed and replaced with suites.

The building underwent significant renovations in recent years to modernize the roof, lighting, air conditioning system, concession stands, and restrooms. In addition, adjustable curtains were installed over some of the eastern and southern windows of the arena to further prevent sunlight glare during afternoon events, especially for the benefit of those viewing the events on television. The $12.64 million project began in December 2013, and was completed prior to the 2014-15 basketball season. The upgrades were completed in phases in order to prevent total closure and keep the building functional for most events through the renovation period, although area high school graduations were moved elsewhere. As a result of the 2014 renovations, the white foam waffle-shaped ceiling panels, a highly visible and distinctive characteristic of Monte Hale Arena, were permanently removed. The tiles had been an aesthetic design element upon the arena's construction, and also acted as an acoustic buffer. Following the renovations, Murphy Center's ceiling was painted black, and acoustic curtains were installed to help absorb noise.

Other improvements implemented since 2002 include a new wooden floor, all-new blue seats in the reserved seating sections, two new scoreboards (one above the bleachers at each end of the court) with HD videoboards included, four new LED video scoreboards (one above each of the four tunnels at the corners of the court), a new sound system, and modernizing the existing bleacher sections (painting gray, replacing retraction motors, and bringing to ADA standards). The court's design was rotated 180 degrees, along with correspondingly moving the benches, scorers' table, and media row to the opposite sides in order to better accommodate television broadcasts. The locker rooms for the men's tennis and men's & women's basketball teams have been completely renovated as well.

More recent renovations to Murphy Center include improvements to exterior glass, A/V technologies, interior improvements, and a new, updated court design. The biggest upgrade was the glass, which coined the iconic "Glass House" nickname of Murphy Center. SageGlass automatic tinting windows were installed, giving the facility an updated look and better interior experience, featuring dynamic tinting to reduce glare and reduce heat in the facility. This installation is the largest dynamic glass feature in higher education facilities, at 33,000 sq. ft. of glass on the exterior. Interior improvements included a large 17 panel mural showcasing the deep history of the venue, and an improved look for the court surface.

The facility saw different A/V improvements, with two new large Daktronics videoboards behind each goal, Martin Audio line array system, featuring six WPS line array hangs, four SXCF118 subwoofer arrays, two portable WPM array hangs, FP15 court fills, and a CDD12 delay ring around the bowl. Along with this, a new state-of-the-art control room was installed, featuring Ross video systems, allowing for improved in house experiences with the larger videoboards and better infrastructure for ESPN+ broadcasts.

== Gallery ==
Charles M. Murphy Athletic Center
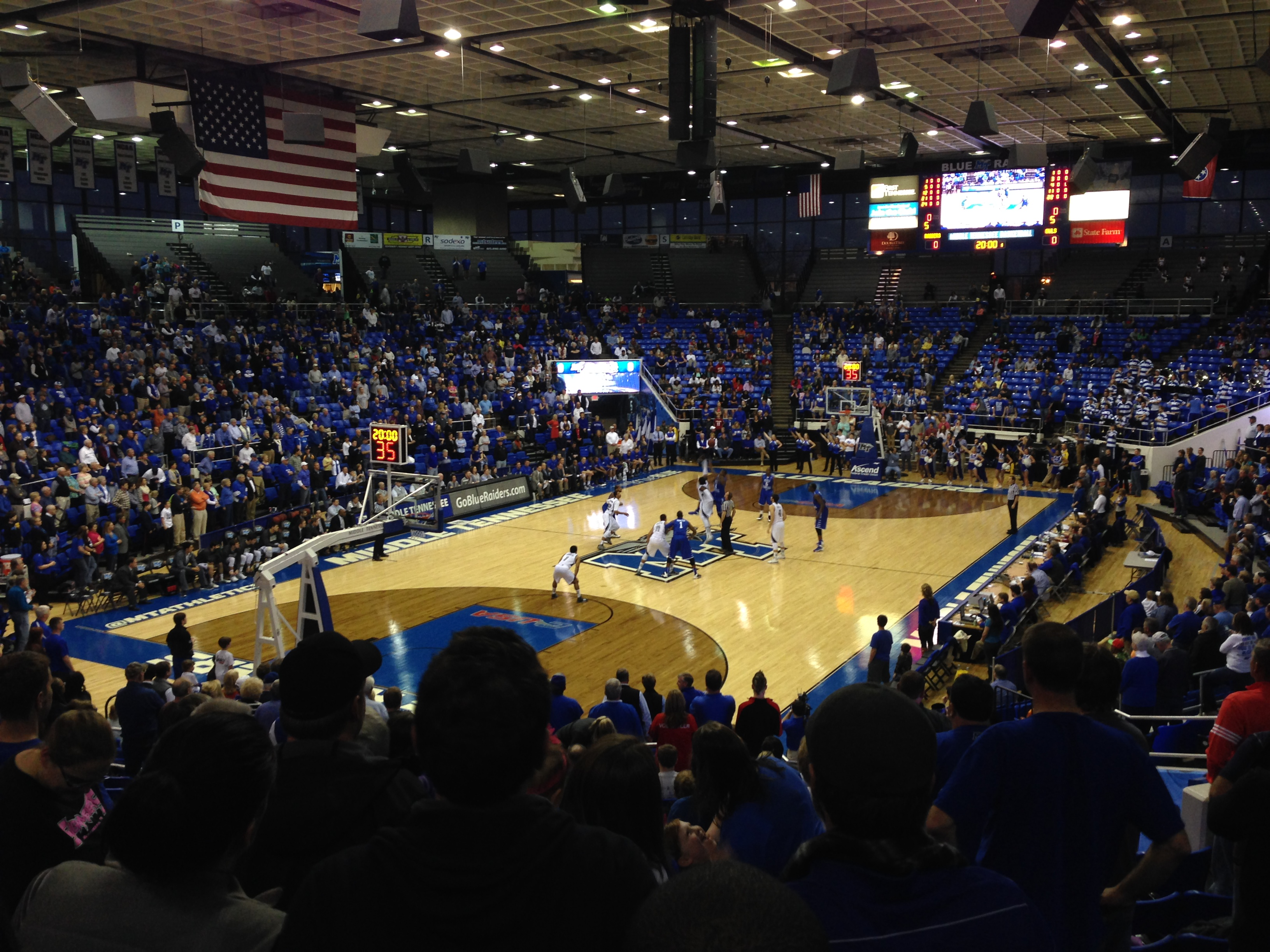
Murphy Center during a men's basketball game vs Rice on March 1, 2014

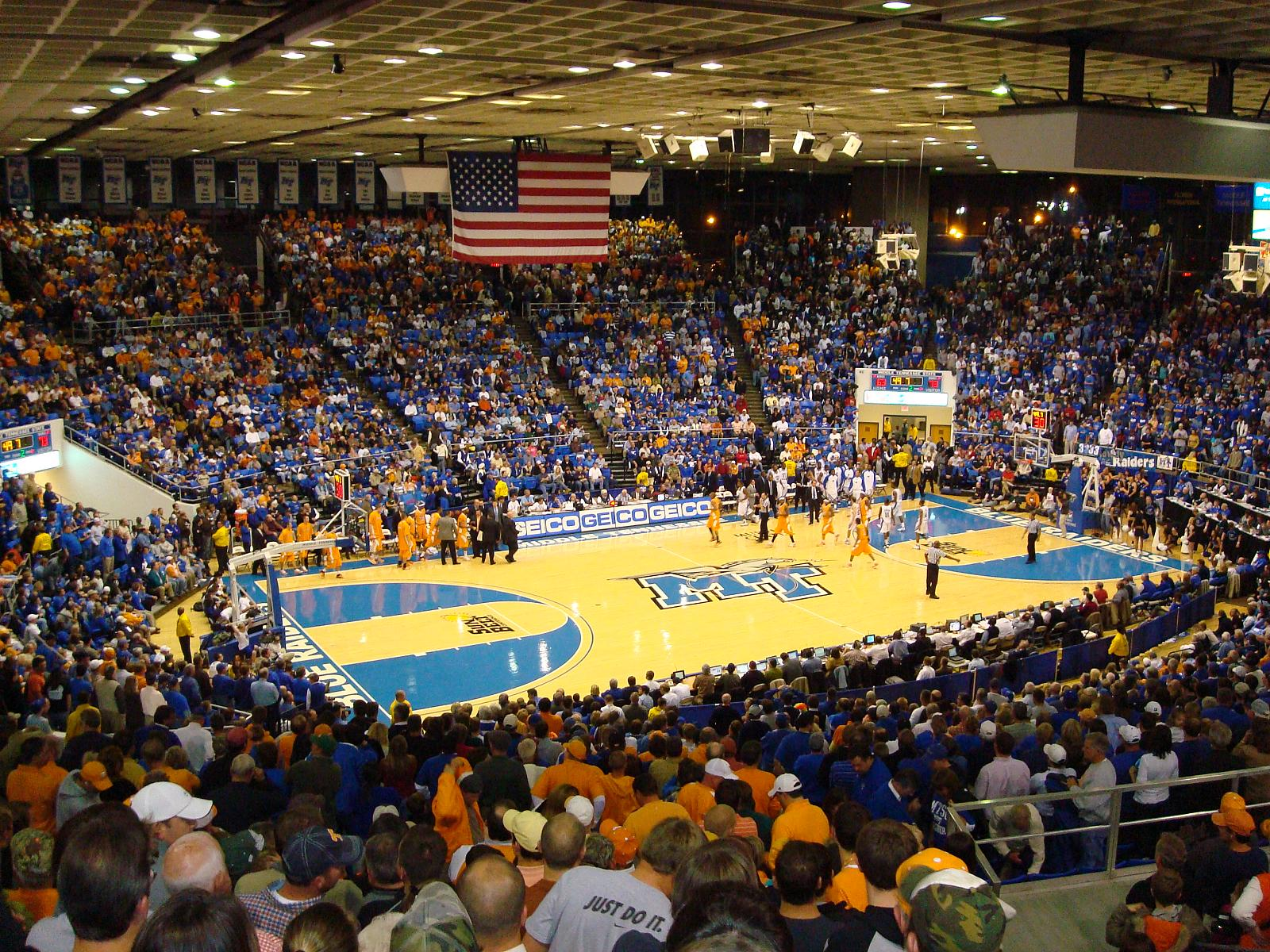
Murphy Center during a men's basketball game vs Tennessee on November 21, 2008

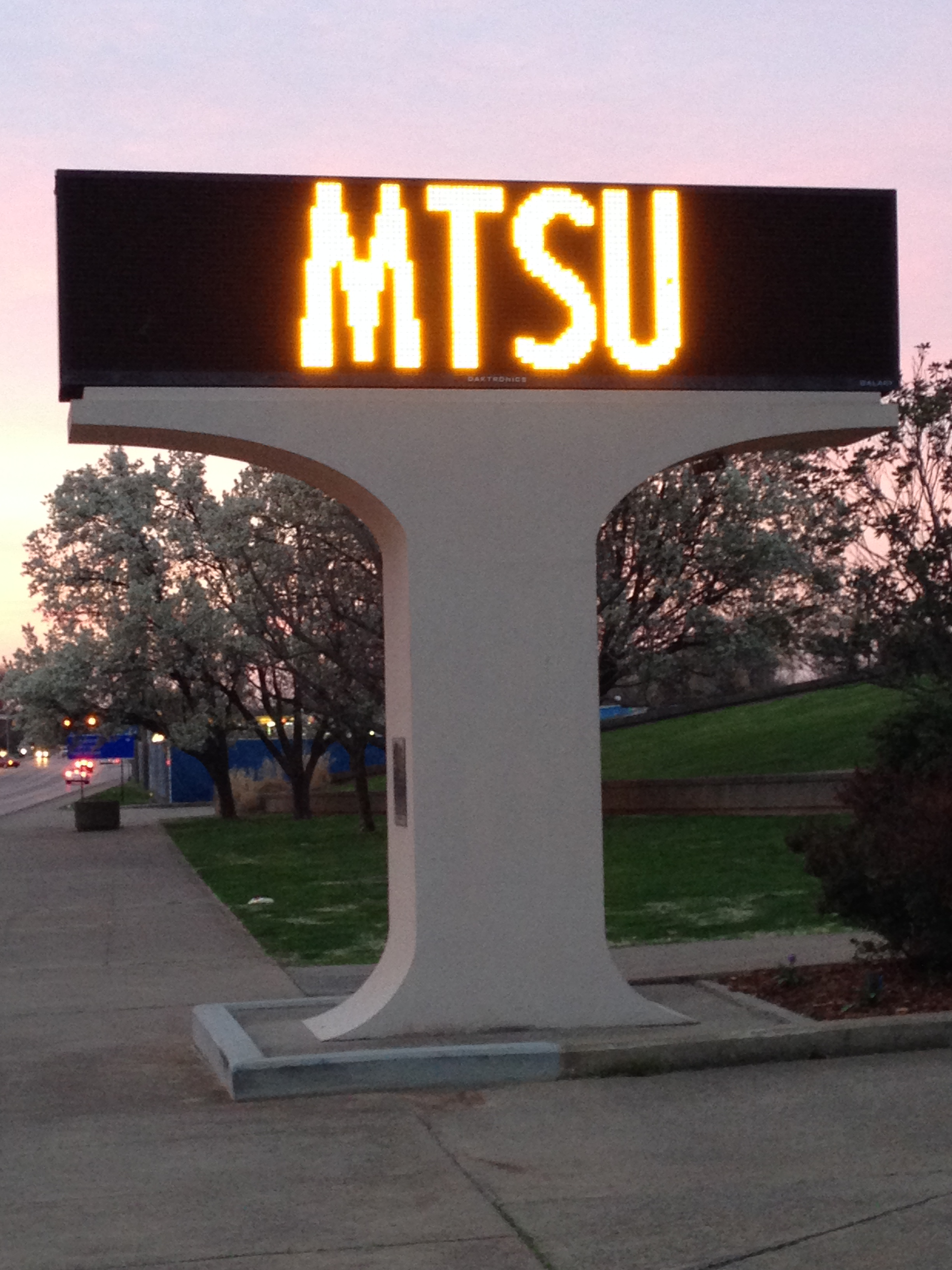
Murphy Center's outdoor electronic marquee stood along Middle Tennessee Boulevard from 1984 to 2017, when it was removed for a road widening project.

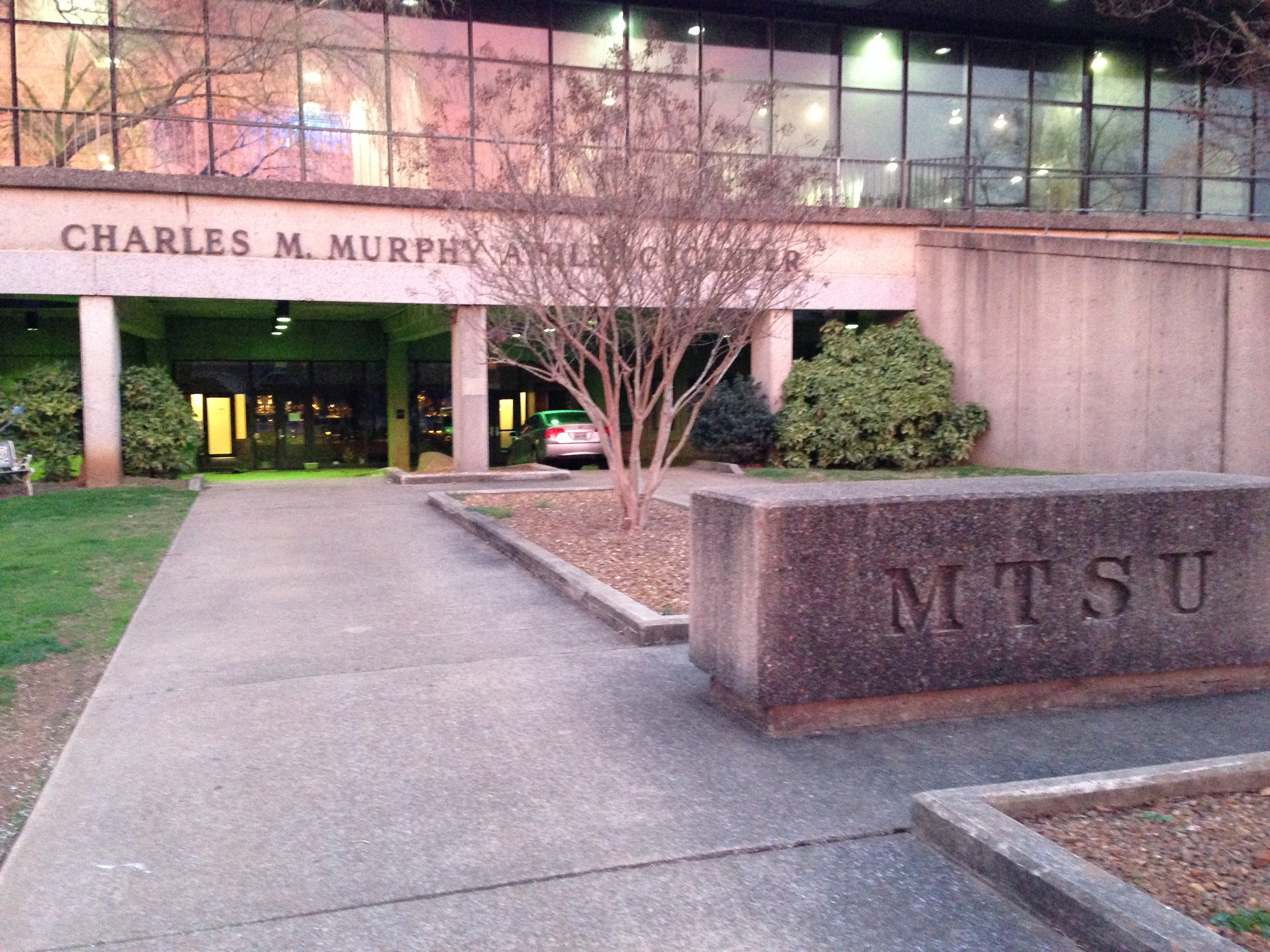
The entrance to Murphy Center's first-floor lobby faces Middle Tennessee Boulevard.

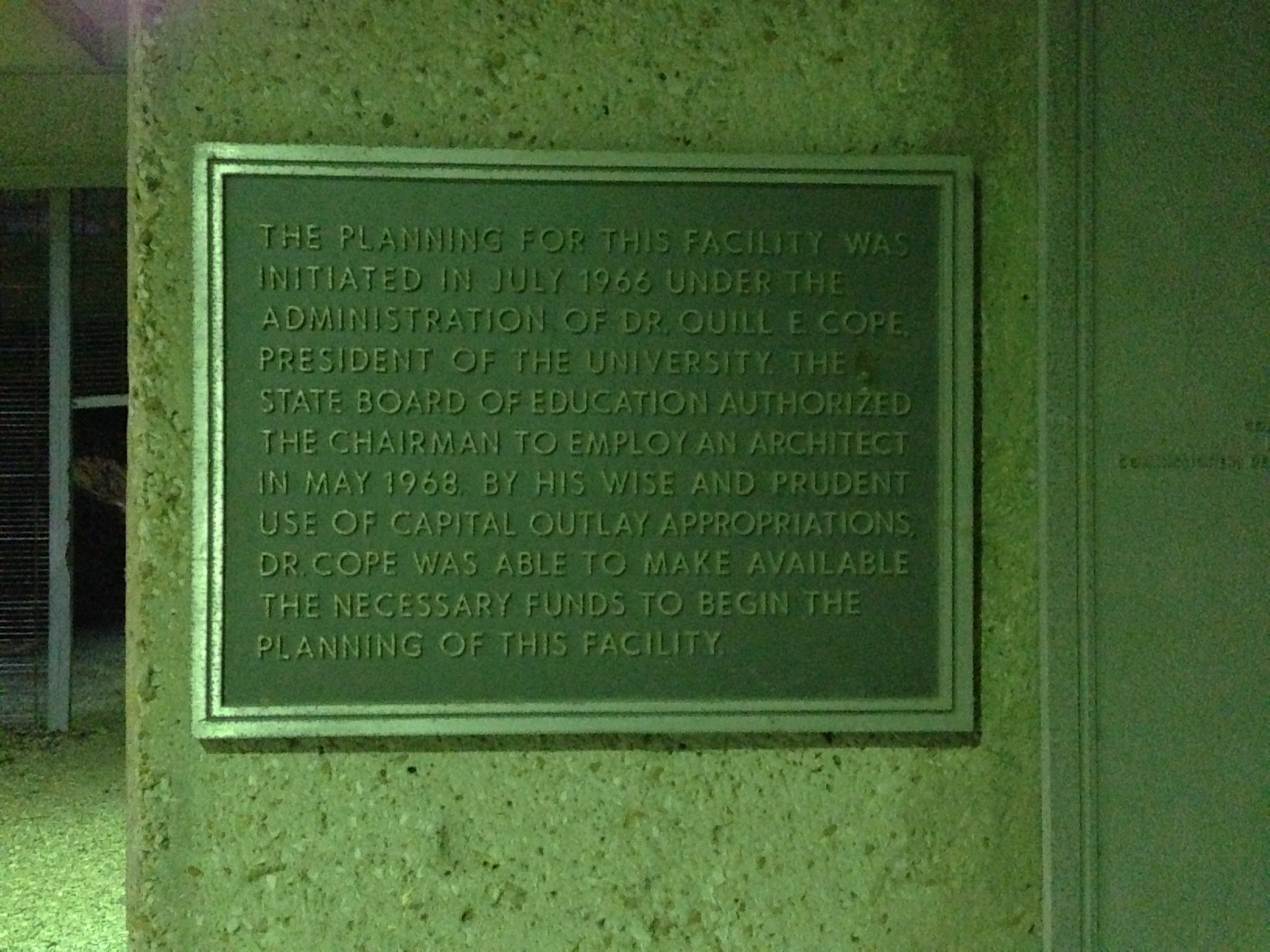
A plaque placed outside the first-floor main entrance explaining how Murphy Center received state funding

== See also ==
- List of NCAA Division I basketball arenas
