= Monte Hale (sportscaster) =

American radio personality

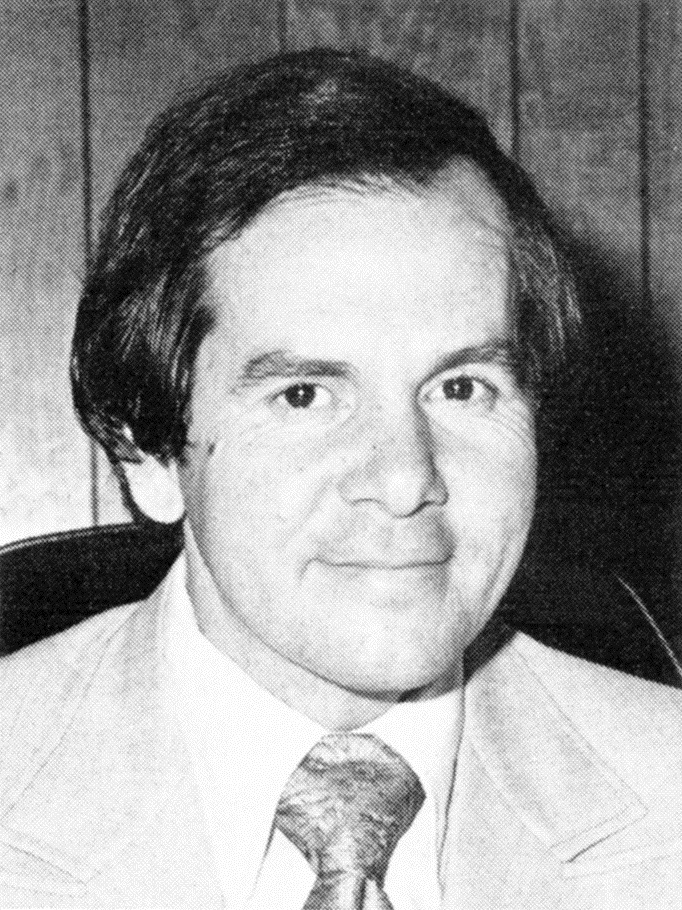
- Hale in 1978
- Born: November 17, 1939; Charleston, West Virginia
- Died: January 2, 1982 (aged 42)
- Occupation: Radio personality

Monte Hale (November 17, 1939 - January 2, 1982) was a radio personality and owner of the WMTS-AM and FM radio stations located in Murfreesboro, Tennessee. Hale also served as part-owner of WGNS. From 1960 to 1981, Hale performed radio play-by-play duties for Middle Tennessee State University's football and basketball teams, and became known as "the Voice of the Blue Raiders."

== Biography ==
Hale was born in Charleston, West Virginia.

In 1978, he was the play-by-play announcer for the Double-A Nashville Sounds minor league baseball team during their inaugural season in Nashville. Hale also served as play-by-play announcer for Murfreesboro Central High School.

In 1981, he was inducted into MTSU's Kennon Sports Hall of Fame for his contributions as broadcaster for the university's athletic programs.

Doctors discovered a malignant tumor on Hale's tongue in 1966, and removed half of it. Despite that, Hale continued to broadcast as he dealt with cancer for the remainder of his life. Hale died on January 2, 1982.

The school's 11,520-seat basketball arena located in Murphy Center was named after Hale in 1983. The City of Murfreesboro also named a street in his memory.
