= Chuck Valenches =

American baseball broadcaster and voice actor

- Occupation(s): Sports broadcaster, voice actor

Chuck Valenches is a minor league baseball radio broadcaster and voice actor. He most recently served as a play-by-play announcer for the Nashville Sounds, the Triple-A affiliate of the Milwaukee Brewers based in Nashville, Tennessee, from 1998 to 2009.

== Biography ==
Valenches began his career in 1992 as the announcer of the Class-A Midwest League's Kane County Cougars a Single-A affiliate of the Baltimore Orioles. From 1993 to 1995, he was the announcer for the High Desert Mavericks in the Class A California League (Florida Marlins, Baltimore Orioles). In 1996, he moved to the Double-A Jacksonville Suns, the Double-A affiliate of the Detroit Tigers of the Southern League, where he remained through 1997.

During his time in Jacksonville, Valenches also provided play-by-play for the televised "Southern League Game-of-the-Month" and the Jacksonville University baseball team.

In 1998, Valenches began providing commentary for the Triple-A Nashville Sounds of the Pacific Coast League. He was promoted to the lead play-by-play spot in 2000. He was part of the broadcast team for the 2001 Triple-A All-Star Game in Indianapolis, Indiana and as the play-by-play broadcaster for the "2001 City of Hope Softball Game" broadcast on Country Music Television (CMT) and CMT Canada.

Valenches appeared as an announcer in the 3DO Sports video game series High Heat Baseball from 2002 to 2004, along with Dave O'Brien.

In 2008 and 2009 Valenches was the broadcaster for the Atlantic Sun Conference NCAA Men's and Women's Basketball Tournament, serving as the play-by-play broadcaster for all tournament games over four days outside of the Men's Championship game. The tournament was aired on the web-based A-Sun TV.
