= Nashville Sounds =

Minor League Baseball team in Nashville, Tennessee

- Founded in 1978; Nashville, Tennessee

Team logo	Cap insignia

Minor league affiliations
- Class: Triple-A (1985–present)
- Previous classes: Double-A (1978–1984)
- League: International League (2021–present)
- Division: West Division
- Previous leagues: Pacific Coast League (1998–2020); American Association (1985–1997); Southern League (1978–1984)

Major league affiliations
- Team: Milwaukee Brewers (2021–present)
- Previous teams: Texas Rangers (2019–2020); Oakland Athletics (2015–2018); Milwaukee Brewers (2005–2014); Pittsburgh Pirates (1998–2004); Chicago White Sox (1993–1997); Cincinnati Reds (1987–1992); Detroit Tigers (1985–1986); New York Yankees (1980–1984); Cincinnati Reds (1978–1979)

Minor league titles
- League titles (3): 1979; 1982; 2005
- Conference titles (2): 2003; 2005
- Division titles (11): 1979; 1981; 1982; 1990; 1993; 2003; 2005; 2006; 2007; 2016; 2022
- Second-half titles (6): 1979; 1980; 1981; 1982; 1983; 1984

Team data
- Name: Nashville Sounds (1978–present)
- Colors: Navy, red, white
- Mascot: Booster
- Ballpark: First Horizon Park (2015–present)
- Previous parks: Herschel Greer Stadium (1978–2014)
- Owner/ Operator: MFP Baseball / Nashville Sounds Baseball Club
- General manager: Danielle Gaw
- Manager: Rick Sweet
- Media: 94.9 FM The Fan, MiLB.TV, and Bally Sports Live
- Website: mlb.com/milb/nashville

The Nashville Sounds are a Minor League Baseball team of the International League and the Triple-A affiliate of the Milwaukee Brewers. They are located in Nashville, Tennessee, United States, and are named for the city's association with the music industry, specifically the "Nashville sound", a subgenre of country music which originated in the city in the mid-1950s. The team plays their home games at First Horizon Park, which opened in 2015 on the site of the historic Sulphur Dell ballpark. The Sounds previously played at Herschel Greer Stadium from its opening in 1978 until the end of the 2014 season. They are the oldest active professional sports franchise in Nashville.

Established as an expansion team of the Double-A Southern League in 1978, the Sounds led all of Minor League Baseball in attendance in their inaugural season and continued to draw the Southern League's largest crowds in each of their seven years as members. On the field, the team won six consecutive second-half division titles from 1979 to 1984 and won the Southern League championship twice: in 1979 as the Double-A affiliate of the Cincinnati Reds and again in 1982 as the Double-A affiliate of the New York Yankees.

The Sounds were replaced by a Triple-A American Association team in 1985. The Triple-A Sounds carried on the history of the Double-A team that preceded them. Nashville rarely contended for the American Association championship, making only three appearances in the postseason during their 13 years as members. They joined the Triple-A Pacific Coast League in 1998 following the dissolution of the American Association after the 1997 season. Over 23 years in the league, the team qualified for the playoffs on five occasions. They won their lone Pacific Coast League championship in 2005 as the Triple-A affiliate of the Milwaukee Brewers. In conjunction with Major League Baseball's reorganization of Minor League Baseball in 2021, the Sounds were placed in the Triple-A East, which became the International League in 2022. They have since made one postseason appearance but have not won the International League championship.

Nashville has served as a farm club for eight Major League Baseball franchises. A total of 29 managers have led the club and its more than 1,600 players. As of the completion of the 2026 season, their 49th year in Nashville, the Sounds have played 6,874 regular-season games and compiled a win–loss record of 3,570–3,302–2 (.519). They have a postseason record of 42–42 (.500) in 84 games. Combining all 6,958 regular-season and postseason games, the Sounds have an all-time record of 3,612–3,344–2 (.519).

== History ==
=== Prior professional baseball in Nashville ===
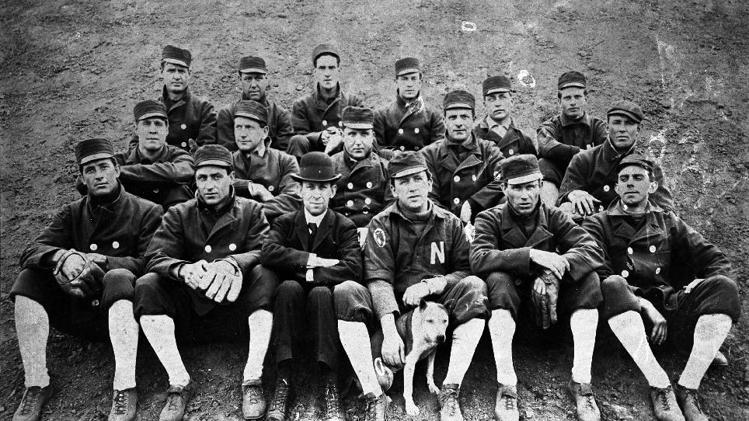
The 1901 Nashville Baseball Club of the Southern Association

Nashville has been home to Minor League Baseball teams since the late 19th century. The city's professional baseball history dates back to 1884 with the formation of the Nashville Americans, who were charter members of the original Southern League from 1885 to 1886 and played their home games at Sulphur Spring Park, later renamed Athletic Park and Sulphur Dell. This ballpark was the home of Nashville's minor league teams through 1963. In 1887, Nashville's Southern League team was called the Nashville Blues. The Nashville Tigers competed in the same league from 1893 to 1894. In 1895, the Nashville Seraphs won the city's first professional championship in the Southern League. The Nashville Centennials played in the Central League in 1897 but relocated to Henderson, Kentucky, during the season before the league's collapse.

The city's longest-operating baseball team, first known only as the Nashville Baseball Club and later renamed the Nashville Vols (short for Volunteers, the state nickname), was formed in 1901 as a charter member of the Southern Association. They remained in the league through 1961, winning eight pennants, nine playoff championships, and four Dixie Series titles. The Southern Association disbanded after the 1961 season, and no team was fielded in 1962, but the Vols played one final campaign in the South Atlantic League in 1963. Sulphur Dell was demolished in 1969, and the city had no professional baseball team for 14 years until 1978.

=== Getting a team and building a ballpark ===
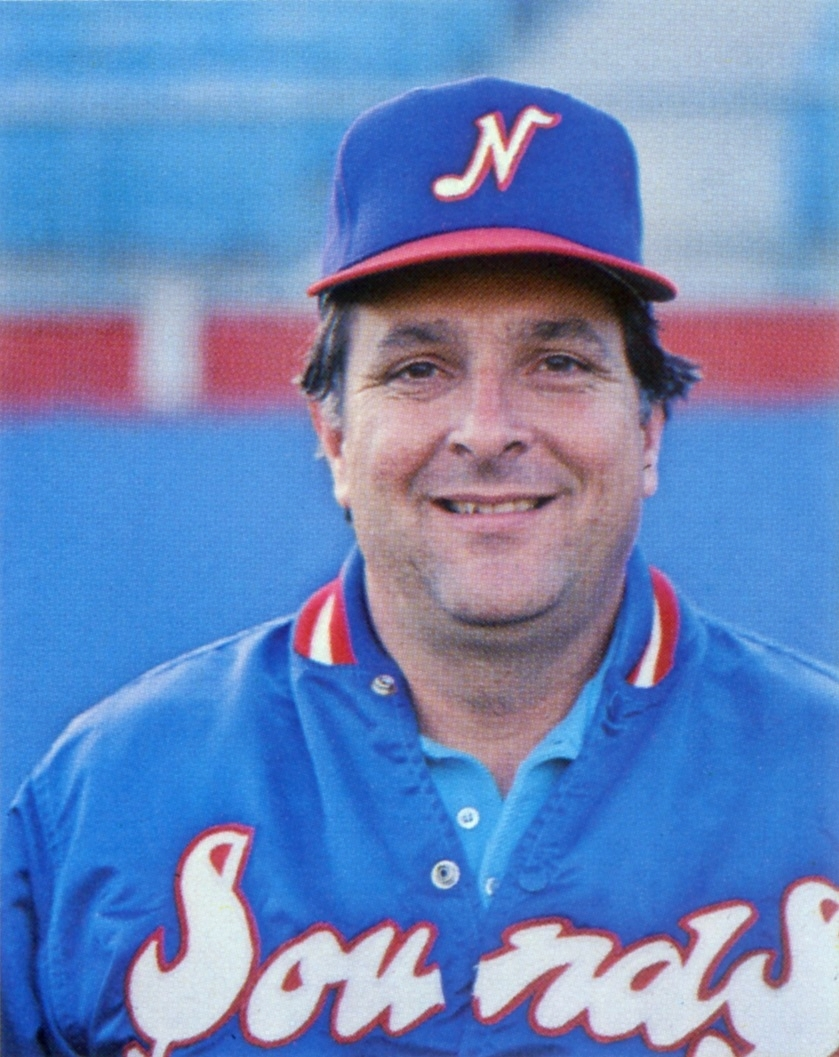
Larry Schmittou led a group of investors that purchased a minor league team and financed the construction of its ballpark.

Larry Schmittou, head coach of the Vanderbilt Commodores baseball team from 1968 to 1978, was instrumental in bringing professional baseball back to Nashville. Along with help from country musician Conway Twitty, Schmittou put together a group of investors including other country artists Cal Smith and Jerry Reed, as well as other Nashvillians, to finance a stadium and a minor league team. The Metro Parks Board agreed to lease to Schmittou the site of Nashville's former softball fields on the grounds of Fort Negley, a Civil War fortification approximately two miles (3.2 km) south of downtown, on which to build. The US$1.5 million ballpark was to be named Herschel Greer Stadium in posthumous honor of Herschel Lynn Greer, a prominent Nashville businessman and president of the Nashville Vols. Schmittou and general manager Farrell Owens landed the Cincinnati Reds as a Major League Baseball affiliate after meeting with Sheldon "Chief" Bender, Cincinnati's farm director, at the 1976 Winter Meetings. The new team was then granted membership in the Southern League, which operated at the Double-A classification.

The team was called the Sounds in reference to the "Nashville sound", a subgenre of American country music that traces its roots to the area in the late 1950s. The team's wordmark and color scheme were lifted from the defunct Memphis Sounds of the American Basketball Association, who used them from 1974 to 1975. The color blue was added to Memphis' red and white palette. Nashville's original logo, which was used from 1978 into 1998, reflected the city's long-standing association with country music. It depicted a mustachioed baseball player, nicknamed "Slugger", swinging at a baseball with an acoustic guitar, a staple of country music, in place of a bat. Further illustrating the city's musical ties was the typeface, with letters that resembled G-clefs, used to display the team name and the cap logo which resembled an eighth note.

=== Southern League ===
==== Cincinnati Reds (1978–1979) ====
With a team in place and a stadium under construction, the Nashville Sounds were set to begin play in 1978 as an expansion team of the Southern League. As the Double-A affiliate of the Cincinnati Reds, they played their first game on April 15, 1978, against the Memphis Chicks at Memphis' Tim McCarver Stadium, which they lost, 4–2. They recorded their first win the next evening, defeating Memphis, 3–0. Their home opener was scheduled to take place on April 25, but was rained out and rescheduled for the next night. On April 26, the Sounds played their first home game, a 12–4 victory, against the Savannah Braves before a sellout crowd of 8,156 fans at Greer Stadium. Nashville placed fourth of five teams in both halves of its inaugural season, which kept the team out of the postseason championship playoffs.

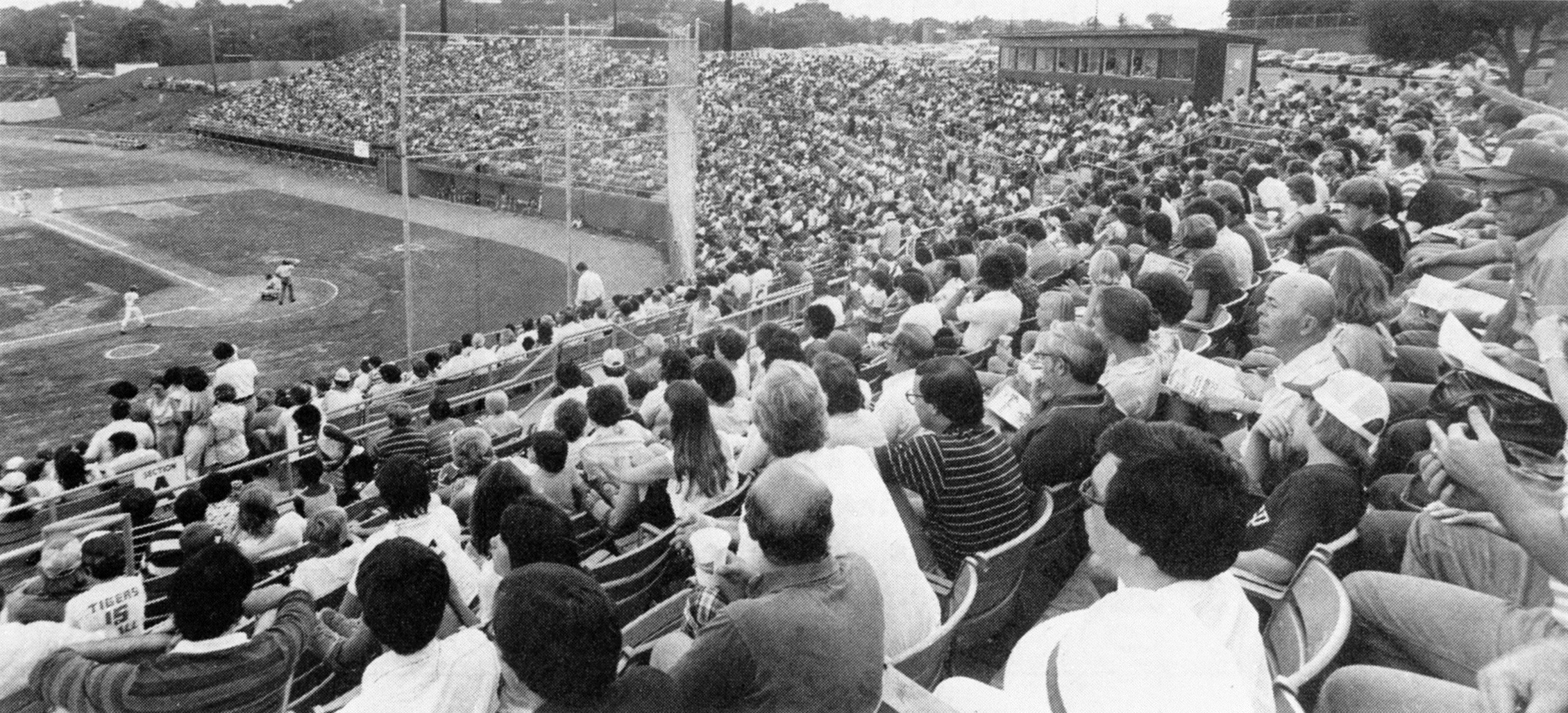
A game during the 1978 season in which Nashville led all of Minor League Baseball in attendance when 380,000 people attended games at Greer Stadium

The Sounds had more success at the turnstiles than on the field as they led all of Minor League Baseball in attendance by drawing 380,000 fans to Greer Stadium in their debut season. Nashville went on to lead the Southern League in attendance in each of their seven seasons of membership. Schmittou's business philosophy revolved around earning profits not from ticket sales, but from the sale of souvenirs and concessions. This approach also involved promoting family-friendly entertainment rather than baseball games. Through the mid-1980s, the Sounds offered nightly promotions and treated fans to a carnival-like atmosphere between innings. The franchise was recognized with the Larry MacPhail Award for outstanding minor league promotions in 1978, 1980, and 1981.

Manager George Scherger led the 1979 Sounds to win the second-half Western Division title, qualifying them for the postseason. After defeating first-half winners Memphis, three games to one, for the Western Division title, they advanced to the league championship series against the Columbus Astros. Nashville won their first Southern League championship by defeating Columbus, three games to one.

Originally, the Reds allowed Nashville to use a designated hitter (DH) in their lineup. This allowance was later revoked since the Reds were a part of the National League in which pitchers bat instead of using a DH. Schmittou felt the Sounds were at a disadvantage against other teams that utilized the designated hitter, so he looked for a new major league affiliate for 1980. After two seasons at Double-A for the Reds, Nashville had a 152–140 win–loss record encompassing all regular-season and postseason games.

==== New York Yankees (1980–1984) ====
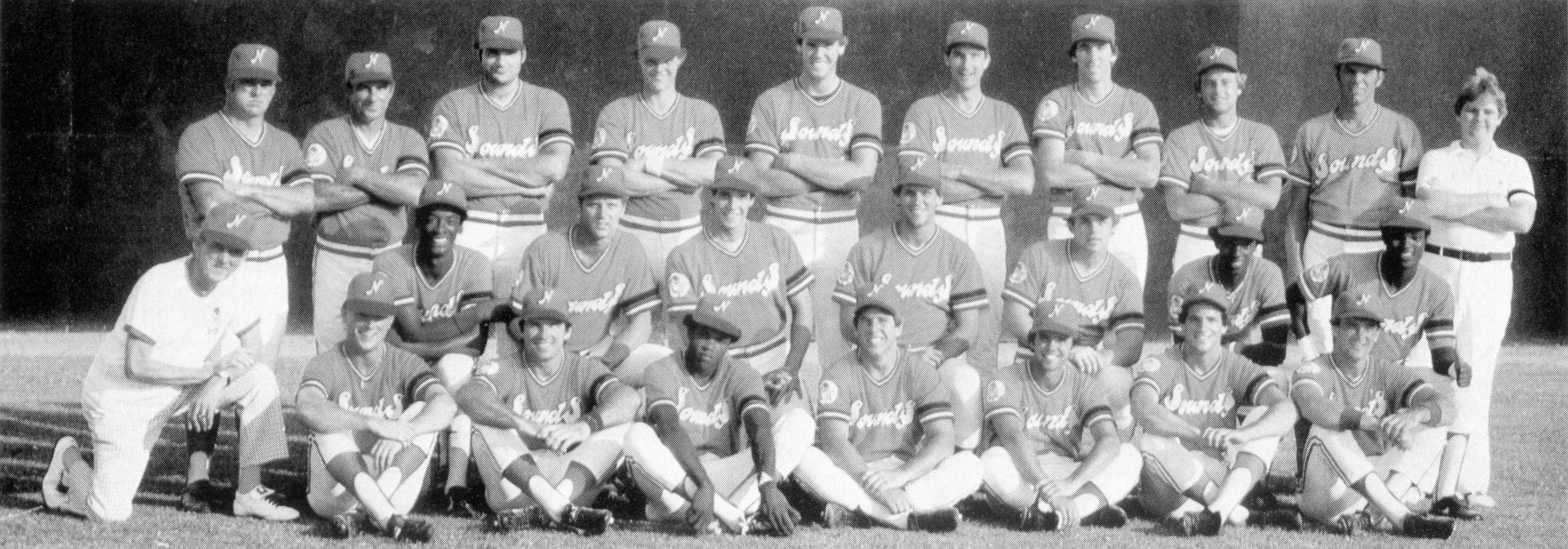
In 1980, the Sounds set a franchise-best 97–46 record and set the Southern League's attendance record with 575,676 fans coming to their home games at Greer.

Schmittou had been encouraged by the New York Yankees to establish the Sounds as a Triple-A team, but he refused to go back on his previous agreement to partner with the Reds at Double-A. After the split with Cincinnati, the Sounds made their first affiliation switch in 1980, becoming the Double-A affiliate of the Yankees. This partnership was the most successful period in team history. They experienced five consecutive winning seasons and won five consecutive second-half Western Division titles, propelling them to the postseason each year.

Under manager Stump Merrill, the 1980 Sounds posted a franchise-best 97–46 record. They won the second half but lost the Western Division series to Memphis. The 1980 club was ranked as the sixty-ninth greatest minor league baseball team of all-time by baseball historians in 2001. Nashville set the league season attendance record that year when 575,676 people attended games at Greer Stadium. The Sounds reached the 1981 championship series via another second-half title and winning the division over Memphis, but they fell to the Orlando Twins in the finals.

The 1982 Sounds, managed by Johnny Oates, finished with a 77–67 record and won the second half. After defeating the Knoxville Blue Jays, 3–1, in the Western Division finals, the Sounds advanced to the league championship series against the Jacksonville Suns, where they won the franchise's second Southern League championship with a 3–1 series victory. The Sounds qualified for the Western Division series in each of the next two seasons, but fell to the Birmingham Barons in 1983, and to Knoxville in 1984. One highlight of the 1984 season was Jim Deshaies pitching the club's first no-hitter against Columbus in the second game of a seven-inning doubleheader on May 4. Otis Nixon set the franchise career record for stolen bases (133) over the 1981 and 1982 seasons. Nashville had a 431–320 record during their five-year affiliation with the Yankees, their best record among all affiliations. Their seven-year record in the Southern League was 583–460.

=== American Association ===
==== Detroit Tigers (1985–1986) ====
In response to a decline in attendance and a decrease in local media coverage, Sounds president Larry Schmittou sought to boost interest in the team through an elevation to the Triple-A classification. He attempted to purchase and relocate one of two available Triple-A franchises late in the 1983 season, but each chose to continue in their markets for 1984. His desire to land a Triple-A team was part of a larger plan to put Nashville in a position to contend for a Major League Baseball franchise in the future.

Schmittou arrived at terms in July 1984 to buy the Triple-A Evansville Triplets of the American Association for a reported sum of $780,000, with plans to move the team from Evansville, Indiana, to Nashville for the 1985 season. The Southern League wanted Schmittou to surrender his franchise to the league, but he had plans to relocate the team to Evansville to continue as the Triplets at Double-A. However, a combination of the league's disapproval of the move and the City of Evansville being unwilling to upgrade Bosse Field resulted in a move to Huntsville, Alabama, where the team became the Huntsville Stars. The Triple-A Sounds carried on the history of the Double-A team that preceded them. The Triplets' legacy was retired, and the Stars were established as an entirely new franchise.

The Sounds began Triple-A competition in 1985 as members of the American Association affiliated with the Detroit Tigers, continuing the major league affiliation that was in place with the Evansville franchise. Their first Triple-A game was a 3–1 win against the Buffalo Bisons at Greer Stadium on April 11. Though narrowly missing the playoffs in their first season with the Tigers, the Sounds ended their affiliation with Detroit after a lackluster 1986 campaign and two years of poor attendance. Over two seasons with the Tigers, they had a 139–144–2 record. Their all-time record stood at 722–604–2 after nine years of play.

==== Cincinnati Reds (1987–1992) ====
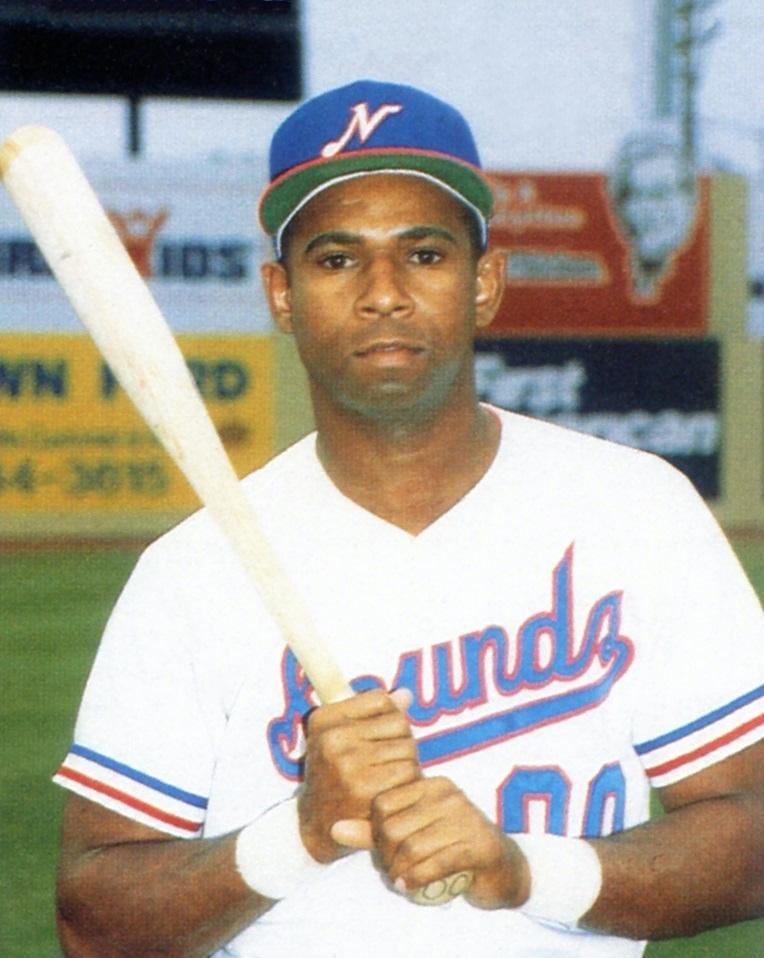
Skeeter Barnes, a Sound in 1979 and from 1988 to 1990, is the team career leader in games played (514), at bats (1,848), and hits (517).

The Sounds rejoined the Cincinnati Reds farm system as their Triple-A affiliate in 1987 in a bid to increase attendance. Schmittou indicated that market surveys consistently showed the Reds to be the most popular MLB team in the area. In 1990, Nashville set its all-time attendance record when 605,122 fans attended games at Greer Stadium. The Sounds experienced their most successful season with the Reds at Triple-A and as members of the American Association that year when they compiled an 86–61 record under manager Pete Mackanin. Ending the regular-season in a tie with the Buffalo Bisons, the Sounds won the Eastern Division title in a one-game playoff. They advanced to their first American Association championship series, but they ultimately lost to the Omaha Royals.

Apart from the 1990 season, the Sounds finished too far back to qualify for the postseason in the other five years of affiliation with the Reds. However, several franchise records were set during this period. Skeeter Barnes, who had previously played with Nashville in 1979, set the career records for games played (514), at bats (1,848), and hits (517) during his second stint from 1988 to 1990. Pitcher Hugh Kemp started a record 73 games from 1987 to 1989. Greer Stadium, once one of the best stadiums in Triple-A baseball in terms of player and fan amenities, began to be outshined by newer ballparks being built in the late 1980s. The Reds let their player development contract with the Sounds expire so they could place their Triple-A affiliate in Indianapolis, which was closer and planning to build a new stadium. Nashville's record after six years with Cincinnati at Triple-A was 431–436. Through 15 total years of competition, their all-time record stood at 1,207–1,040–2.

==== Chicago White Sox (1993–1997) ====
At the recommendation of the Office of the Commissioner of Baseball and with few options available, the Sounds signed a new player development contract with the Chicago White Sox, who wanted to move their Triple-A team closer than its previous location in Vancouver. The White Sox then presented a list of complaints about the relatively poor condition of Greer Stadium. Unable to convince the city to pay for a new ballpark, and deciding against moving the team elsewhere in the Nashville area, Schmittou made significant improvements to Greer. One of those was the addition of its signature guitar-shaped scoreboard, which was installed before the 1993 season. At one point, Schmittou considered dropping the Sounds back to Double-A due to the difficulty of bringing Greer up to the specifications of a Triple-A facility. Instead, renovations continued over the next several years in an attempt to meet Triple-A standards.

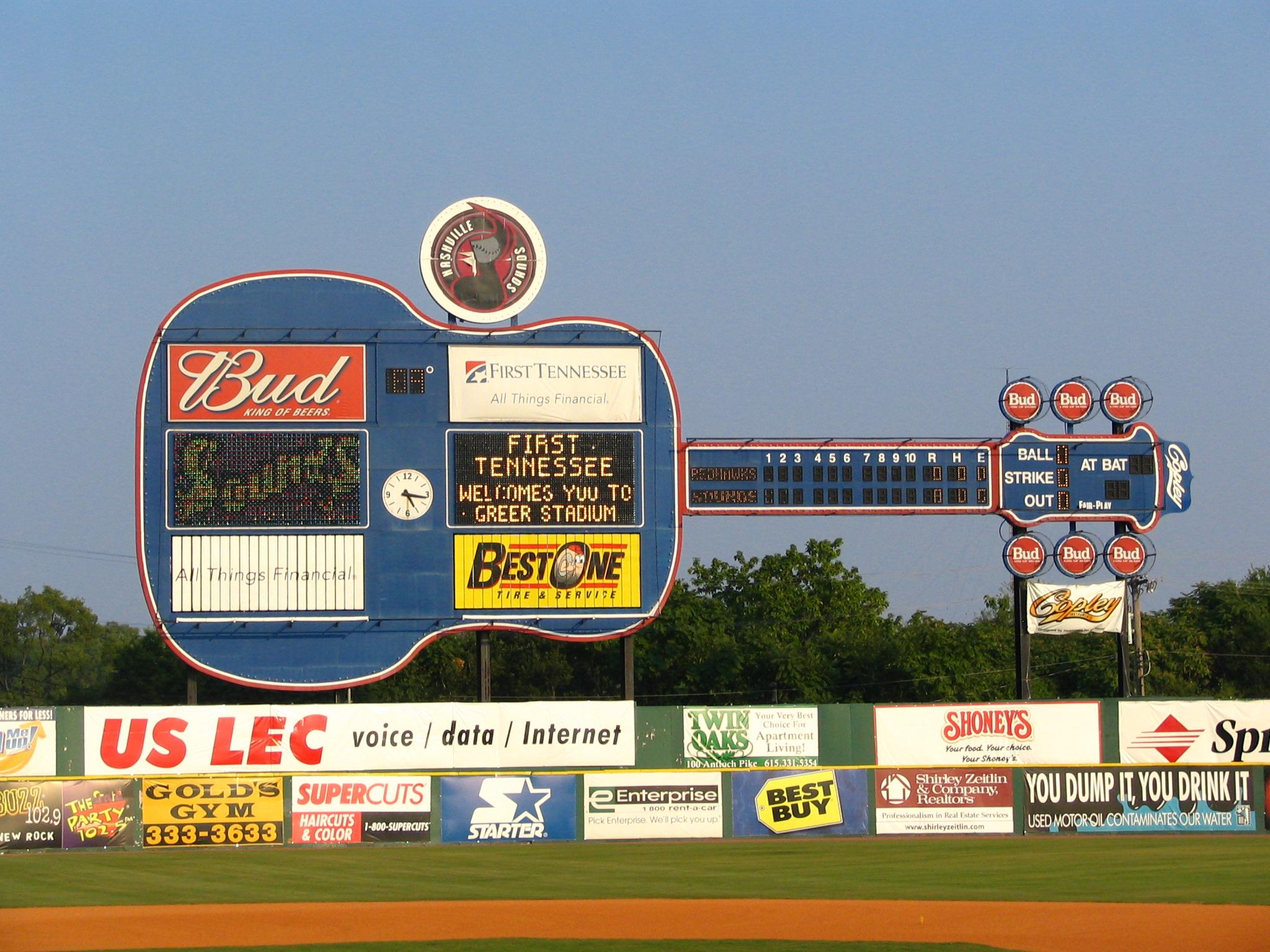
Greer Stadium's guitar scoreboard was installed prior to the 1993 season.

The Sounds shared Greer Stadium with the Southern League's Nashville Xpress, previously known as the Charlotte Knights, during the 1993 and 1994 seasons. This came about when Charlotte acquired a Triple-A expansion franchise in 1993, leaving the existing Double-A team without a home. Schmittou offered Greer as a temporary home ballpark for the team. To accommodate an additional club, the Xpress' home games were scheduled for during the Sounds' road trips.

Nashville reached the American Association playoffs in each of their first two years with the White Sox. The 1993 team clinched the Eastern Division title but lost the championship series to the Iowa Cubs. In 1994, the Sounds swept the New Orleans Zephyrs in three games to advance to the league finals, but they were defeated by the Indianapolis Indians. The team failed to reach the postseason again during their remaining three years with Chicago. The five-year White Sox affiliation ended after the 1997 season with the Sounds having a 390–342 record with four winning seasons over that period. After 13 years, their American Association record stood at 960–922–2, and their all-time 20-year record was 1,543–1,382–2.

The 1996 season marked the last that Schmittou was the team's president and part majority owner. The city was poised to welcome a National Football League franchise, the Tennessee Titans, and Schmittou felt that revenue would be drawn away from the team. He and another investor sold their controlling financial interests in the Sounds to Chicago-based businessmen Al Gordon, Mike Murtaugh, and Mike Woleben.

=== Pacific Coast League ===
==== Pittsburgh Pirates (1998–2004) ====
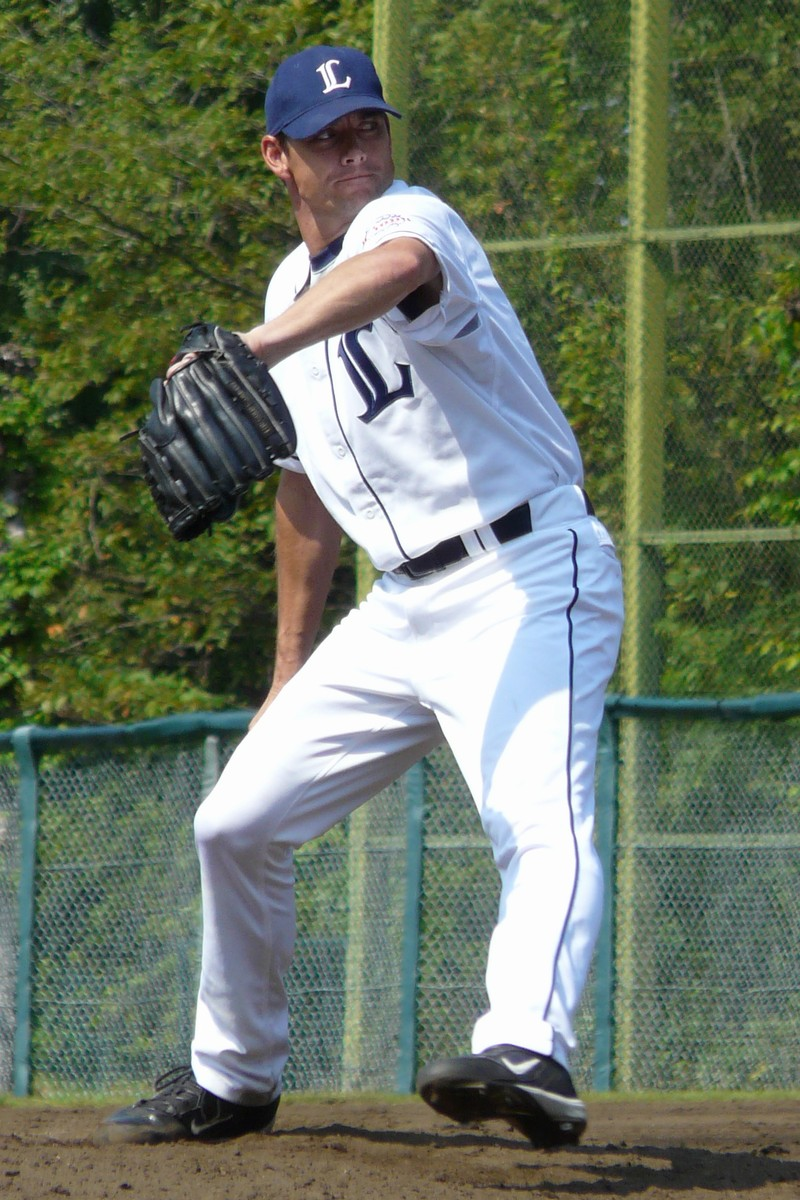
John Wasdin pitched a perfect game for the Sounds on April 7, 2003.

The American Association, of which the Sounds had been members since 1985, disbanded after the 1997 season, and its teams were absorbed by the two remaining Triple-A leagues. Nashville joined the Pacific Coast League (PCL), becoming the easternmost team in the circuit. In another change, they began to adopt new colors and logos over the course of the 1998 and 1999 seasons, phasing out the original colors and marks in use since their foundation in 1978. The new primary logo, replacing the original "Slugger", consisted of a black, red, and white eighth note with a baseball in the top set against a circle of the same colors, plus silver, bearing the team name in white around the sides.

The Sounds entered the Pacific Coast League as the top farm club of the Pittsburgh Pirates, who sought to escape the chilly climate and lengthy travel associated with their previous affiliate in Calgary. The team regularly finished third or fourth in their four-team division, leaving them out of the playoffs. One of their three winning seasons occurred in 2003 when Trent Jewett managed the Sounds to clinch the American Conference Eastern Division title, giving them their first postseason berth in the PCL and first playoff appearance since 1994. Nashville defeated the Albuquerque Isotopes in the conference series but then lost the league finals to the Sacramento River Cats. Earlier in 2003, right-hander John Wasdin pitched the first perfect game in Sounds history on April 7 against Albuquerque at Greer Stadium. The 4–0 Sounds win was the second nine-inning perfect game in the PCL's 101-year history.

Several franchise records were set during this affiliation. Chad Hermansen, a Sound from 1998 to 2002, holds the career records for runs (303), home runs (92), and runs batted in (286). Tike Redman hit a record 32 triples from 2000 to 2003. Closing pitcher Mark Corey set the record for saves (46) during the 2003 and 2004 seasons. Seeking to place their Triple-A club at a newer, more desirable stadium and to alleviate the high travel costs associated with playing in the PCL, Pittsburgh ended their affiliation with the Sounds after the 2004 campaign. Over seven years as a Pirates affiliate, Nashville had a 493–508 record. Through 27 years of competition, the Sounds' all-time record stood at 2,036–1,890–2.

==== Milwaukee Brewers (2005–2014) ====
Nashville became the Triple-A affiliate of the Milwaukee Brewers in 2005. One factor in the Brewers' choice to partner with the Sounds was the hope that they would soon get a new stadium to replace the then-27-year-old Greer. They debuted a new logo that season consisting of a silhouetted baseball player hitting a ball toward the Nashville skyline set against a yellow oval within a red border with the city's name written above and the team nickname written in large red and black script at the bottom. The affiliation started well as manager Frank Kremblas led the club to win the American Conference Northern Division title with a 75–69 record. The team went on to win the conference title against the Oklahoma RedHawks, three games to two, before sweeping the Tacoma Rainiers in three games to win the Pacific Coast League championship. This was Nashville's first championship at the Triple-A level since moving to the classification in 1985 and their first overall since 1982.

From May 5–6, 2006, the Sounds participated in a 24-inning game against the New Orleans Zephyrs, which was played over the course of two days and lasted eight hours and seven minutes. This matched the PCL record for the longest game, in terms of innings played. The Sounds finished the season tied with the Iowa Cubs for first place, but won the division title and advanced to the postseason via tiebreaker by means of having won the regular-season series versus Iowa. Nashville lost to the Round Rock Express in the conference series.

On June 25, 2007, Manny Parra pitched the club's second perfect game, the third nine-inning perfect game in the PCL's history, on the road against Round Rock. Kremblas led the team to capture the division title for the third consecutive year and finish the season with a league-best 89–55 record. Ultimately, they were defeated by New Orleans in the conference series. The Sounds failed to win the division and qualify for the postseason during the next seven years of their Brewers affiliation despite narrow second-place finishes in 2009 and 2014. The 2013 team set the franchise record low win–loss record with a 57–87 mark.

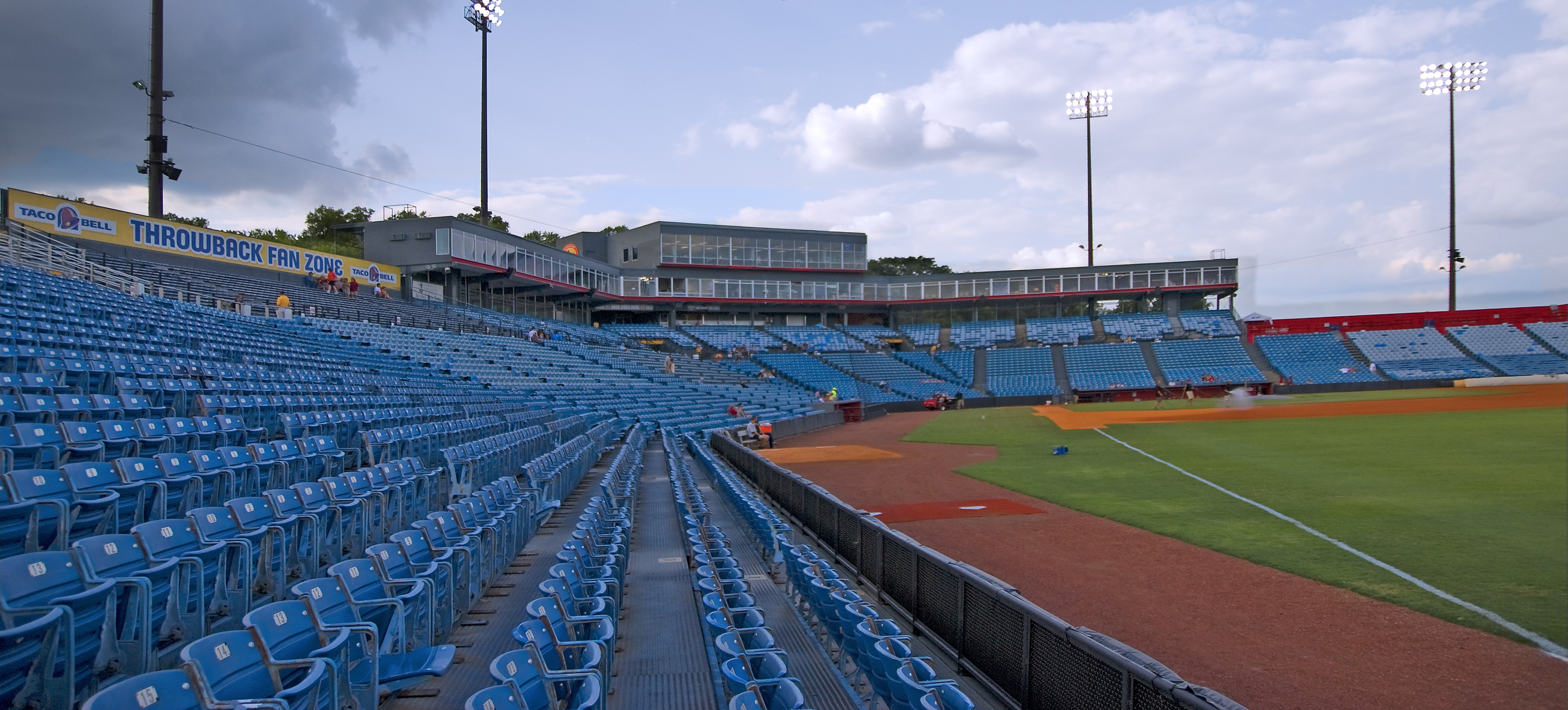
After 37 seasons, the Sounds played their final game at Greer Stadium on August 27, 2014.

The Sounds had planned to leave Greer Stadium in the mid-2000s for a new ballpark to be called First Tennessee Field, but the project was abandoned when a financing agreement between the team and the city could not be reached. After the 2008 season and failing to secure a new facility, Al Gordon's Amerisports Companies sold the team to MFP Baseball, a New York-based group of investors consisting of Masahiro Honzawa, Steve Posner, and Frank Ward. Keeping the team in Nashville was one of the PCL's top criteria for approval of the sale. The new owners made significant renovations to Greer while they continued to explore building a new stadium in the area.

Prior to the 2014 season, the team, Metro Nashville, and the State of Tennessee finalized a plan to build a new downtown ballpark in time for the 2015 season. On August 27, 2014, the Sounds played their final game at Greer Stadium, an 8–5 loss to the Sacramento River Cats. The attendance at the game was a standing-room-only crowd of 11,067, the first sellout since 2010, and the largest crowd since 2007.

The Sounds severed ties with Milwaukee after the 2014 season citing poor on-field performance from recent Brewers Triple-A teams. Over the 10-year affiliation, the longest in Nashville's history, the Sounds had a 732–721 record. Overall, the Sounds' 37-year record stood at 2,768–2,611–2.

==== Oakland Athletics (2015–2018) ====
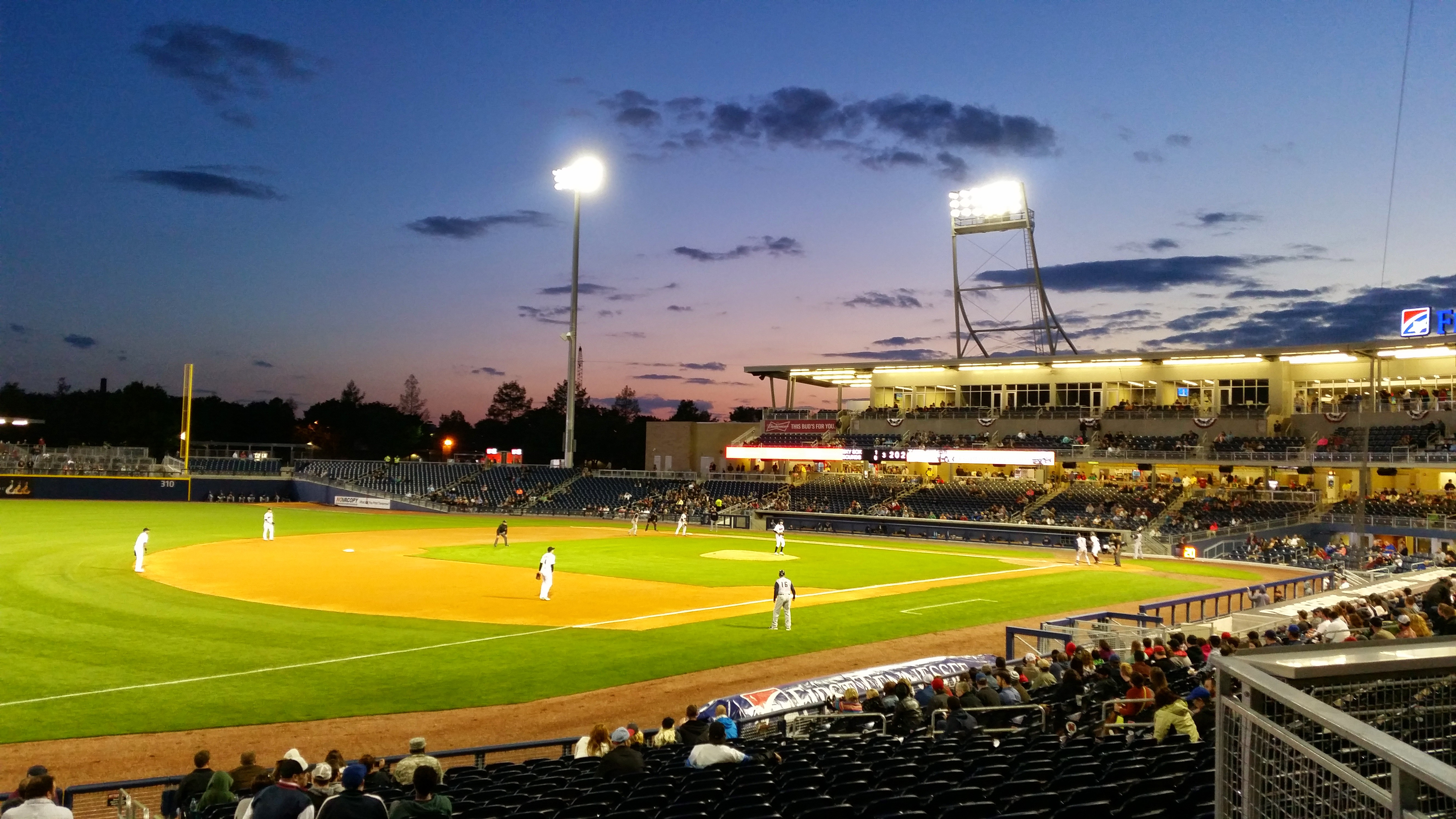
The Sounds played their first game at First Horizon Park, then known as First Tennessee Park, on April 17, 2015.

Nashville affiliated with the Oakland Athletics in 2015 due in part to the organization's commitment to fielding competitive teams at the Triple-A level, an area in which co-owner Frank Ward felt Milwaukee lacked. The Sounds also introduced a new set of logos that incorporated elements reflecting Nashville's "Music City" moniker, such as guitars, picks, and sound holes, as well as neon signs like those in the city's Broadway entertainment district. The team initially elected to embrace a new color scheme that included Broadway Burnt Orange, Sunburst Tan, Neon Orange, and Cash Black. However, the team returned to the previous red and black palette, with the addition of platinum silver as an accent color, before the season began after receiving mixed feedback from team fans. The new primary logo was a red "N" set against a silver guitar pick, both with black borders.

The start of the 2015 season marked the first time that the Sounds played at the new $91-million First Horizon Park, then known as First Tennessee Park, which is located at the site of the historic Sulphur Dell ballpark just north of the Tennessee State Capitol in downtown Nashville. In the facility's inaugural game on April 17, the Sounds defeated the Colorado Springs Sky Sox, 3–2 in 10 innings, with a walk-off double in front of a crowd of 10,459 people.

In Nashville's second season as an A's affiliate, they reached the postseason for the first time since 2007 with a league-best 83–59 record and the American Conference Southern Division title, but they were unable to advance past the conference series versus the Oklahoma City Dodgers. Joey Wendle hit a franchise career-record 102 doubles from 2015 to 2017. The Sounds declined to renew their contract with the Athletics after the 2018 season, choosing instead to seek a new major league affiliate. Over four years with Oakland, they had a 291–279 record. Through 41 seasons, their all-time record stood at 3,059–2,890–2.

==== Texas Rangers (2019–2020) ====
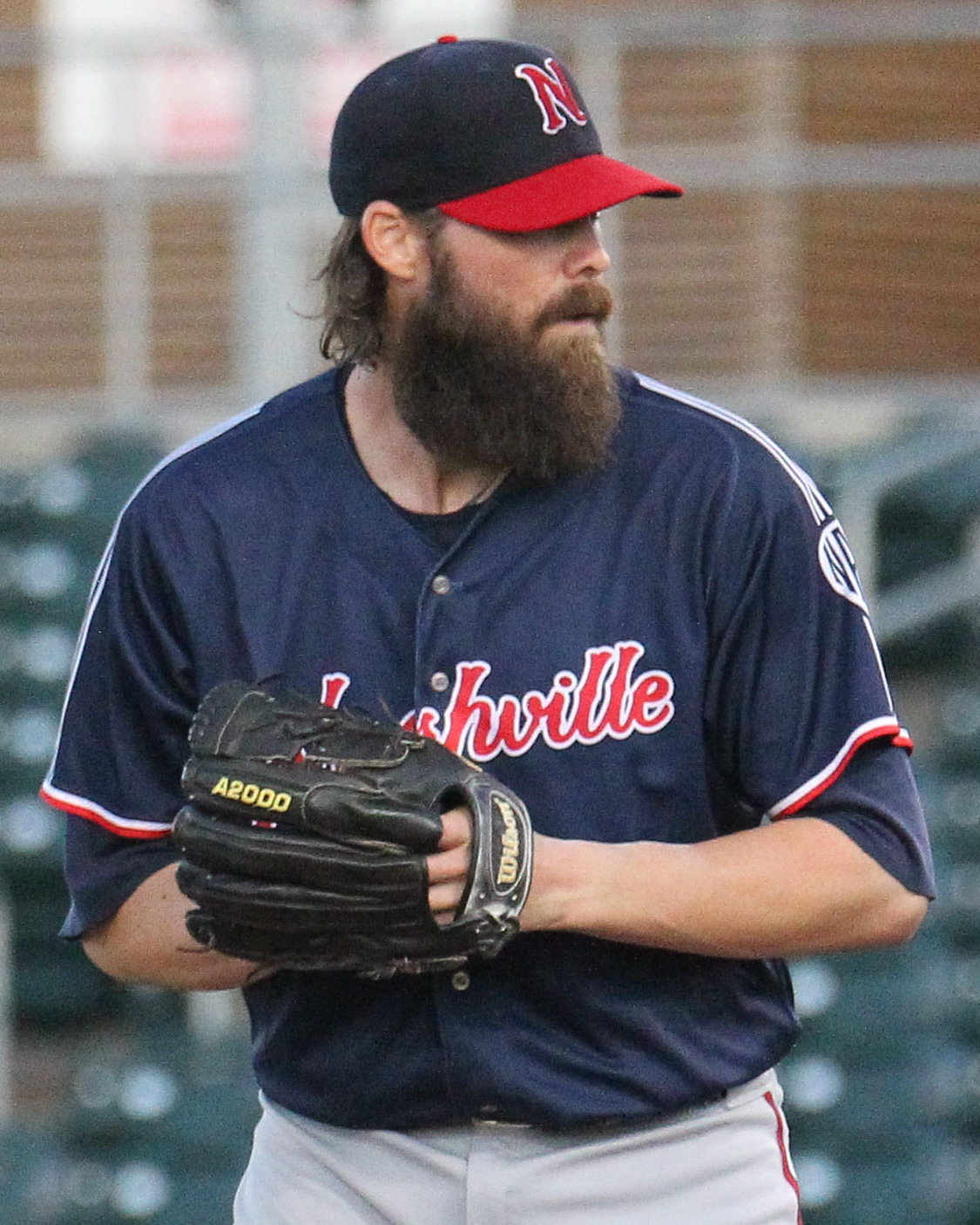
Tim Dillard set multiple career pitching records from 2007 to 2014 and in 2019.

Nashville became the Triple-A affiliate of the Texas Rangers in 2019. The Sounds sought out the Rangers after identifying them as one of the most popular MLB teams among local fans—behind the Atlanta Braves and St. Louis Cardinals—and for their geographical proximity. Also in 2019, just four years after their previous rebranding, the team debuted new colors and logos that combine elements from their original visual identity and the musical imagery present throughout their franchise history. The new colors, navy blue, red, and white, are modernized versions of their original 1978 colors. The primary logo is a pair of concentric red rings with the team name in navy between the two divided horizontally at its center by red and blue stripes; a navy "N" resembling the F-hole of a guitar or violin is in the inner ring, which is styled like a baseball.

Veteran sidearm pitcher Tim Dillard, previously with the Sounds from 2007 to 2014, returned to the team in 2019. In his second stretch, he set the franchise career records for games pitched (242) and strikeouts (437) while adding to his existing marks for wins (48) and innings pitched (710). The 2019 season became the Sounds' only year of play as a Rangers affiliate. The start of the 2020 season was initially postponed due to the COVID-19 pandemic before being cancelled altogether.

Following the 2020 season, Major League Baseball assumed control of Minor League Baseball in a move to increase player salaries, modernize facility standards, and reduce travel. Affiliations were rearranged to situate Triple-A teams closer to their major league parent clubs. The Rangers moved their Triple-A team back to Round Rock, Texas, where it had been prior to partnering with Nashville. As a Texas farm club, the Sounds had a 66–72 record, their lowest record among all affiliations. Nashville held a 1,582–1,580 record over 23 years in the Pacific Coast League, while their all-time record stood at 3,125–2,962–2 after 42 seasons played over the course of 43 years.

=== International League ===
==== Milwaukee Brewers (2021–present) ====
The Sounds became the Triple-A affiliate of the Milwaukee Brewers for a second time in 2021 upon signing a 10-year Professional Development License that runs through 2030. The Brewers desired reuniting with Nashville because of the quality of the player facilities at First Horizon Park and convenient travel options to and from the city. Along with Major League Baseball's restructuring of the minors, the Pacific Coast League disbanded, and the Sounds were placed in the Triple-A East.

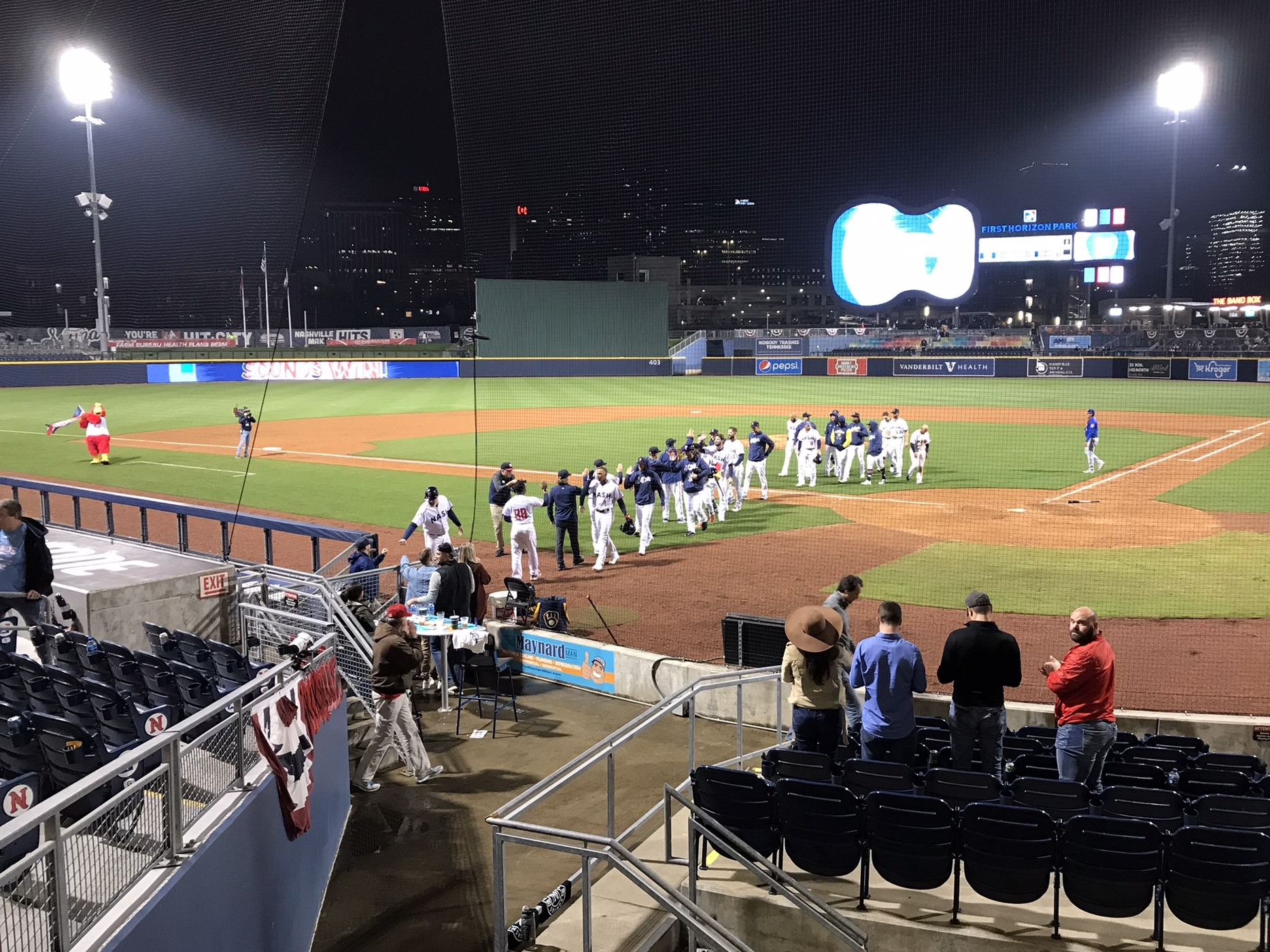
The Sounds celebrating their first International League win on April 5, 2022, at First Horizon Park

In 2022, the Triple-A East became known as the International League (IL), the name historically used by the regional circuit prior to the 2021 reorganization. The Sounds won the Western Division title that season with a league-best 91–58 record. In a single playoff game to determine the International League championship, Nashville was shutout, 13–0, by the Durham Bulls. The franchise was recognized with the Minor League Baseball Organization of the Year Award.

The International League began using a split-season format in 2023 in which the team with the best league-wide record at the end of each half qualifies for the playoffs. The Sounds have not reached the postseason under this format, finishing as close as third in the second half of the 2023 season and in the first halves of both the 2025 and 2026 seasons.

Over a stretch of 15 days in late 2026, Sounds pitchers threw two no-hitters on the road, including a perfect game. On August 23, Brandon Sproat and Tate Kuehner no-hit the Norfolk Tides in the first game of a seven-inning doubleheader for the eighth no-hitter in team history. Fifteen days later, Thomas Pannone pitched the franchise's third perfect game on the road against the Durham Bulls. Pannone threw 94 pitches, the fewest needed in Nashville's three perfect games, and struck out eight batters on the way to accomplishing the fifth nine-inning complete perfect game in IL history. The team posted a 2026 season record of 80–69.

Rick Sweet, who previously led the team in the last season of their former partnership with Milwaukee and since their reaffiliation, has won 564 games over seven seasons, placing him first on the all-time wins list for Sounds managers. Through six seasons of the current Brewers affiliation, Nashville has a 487–382 record. Through 48 full seasons of play, the Sounds have an all-time record of 3,612–3,344–2 encompassing all regular and postseason games over 49 years in Nashville.

== Season-by-season records ==
Season-by-season records (last five seasons)
Season	Regular-season						Postseason			MLB affiliate	Ref.
Season	League	Record	Win %	League	Division	GB	Record	Win %	Result	MLB affiliate	Ref.
2022	IL	91–58	.611	1st	1st	—	0–1	.000	Won Western Division title Lost IL championship vs. Durham Bulls, 1–0	Milwaukee Brewers	
2023	IL	83–65	.561	4th	2nd	1	—	—	—	Milwaukee Brewers	
2024	IL	78–68	.534	4th	3rd	10	—	—	—	Milwaukee Brewers	
2025	IL	85–63	.574	5th	2nd	1 1/2	—	—	—	Milwaukee Brewers	
2026	IL	80–69	.537	6th	3rd	2 1/2	—	—	—	Milwaukee Brewers	
Totals	—	417–323	.564	—	—	—	0–1	.000	—	—	—

== Rivals ==
Nashville's chief rivals have been those based in Memphis, Tennessee. Located approximately 200 miles (320 km) to the southwest and connected to Nashville by Interstate 40, Memphis has fielded several teams which have competed against Nashville's since the late 19th century. The Sounds entered the rivalry when they and the Memphis Chicks joined the Southern League in 1978 as members of its Western Division. For three consecutive seasons, from 1979 to 1981, the teams met in the Western Division finals to vie for a spot in the league championship series.

The intrastate rivalry was interrupted when Nashville moved to the American Association in 1985, but it was renewed when they and the Memphis Redbirds joined the Pacific Coast League in 1998. The teams have been division rivals ever since. Memphis beat out second-place Nashville by two games to clinch the 2009 division title and did likewise in 2014 by two-and-a-half games. In 2016, Nashville won the division with a win in Memphis. Roles were reversed in 2017 and 2018 as Memphis captured division titles in Nashville. In 2021, both teams were placed in the Southeastern Division of the Triple-A East. This became the International League in 2022, and both clubs were realigned into its Western Division. Memphis won the 2026 first-half title on the last day of the half with a win at home over Nashville. As of the completion of the 2026 head-to-head series, the Sounds lead the 29-year rivalry against the Redbirds with a record of 250–214 in 464 meetings.

== Ballparks ==
=== Herschel Greer Stadium (1978–2014) ===
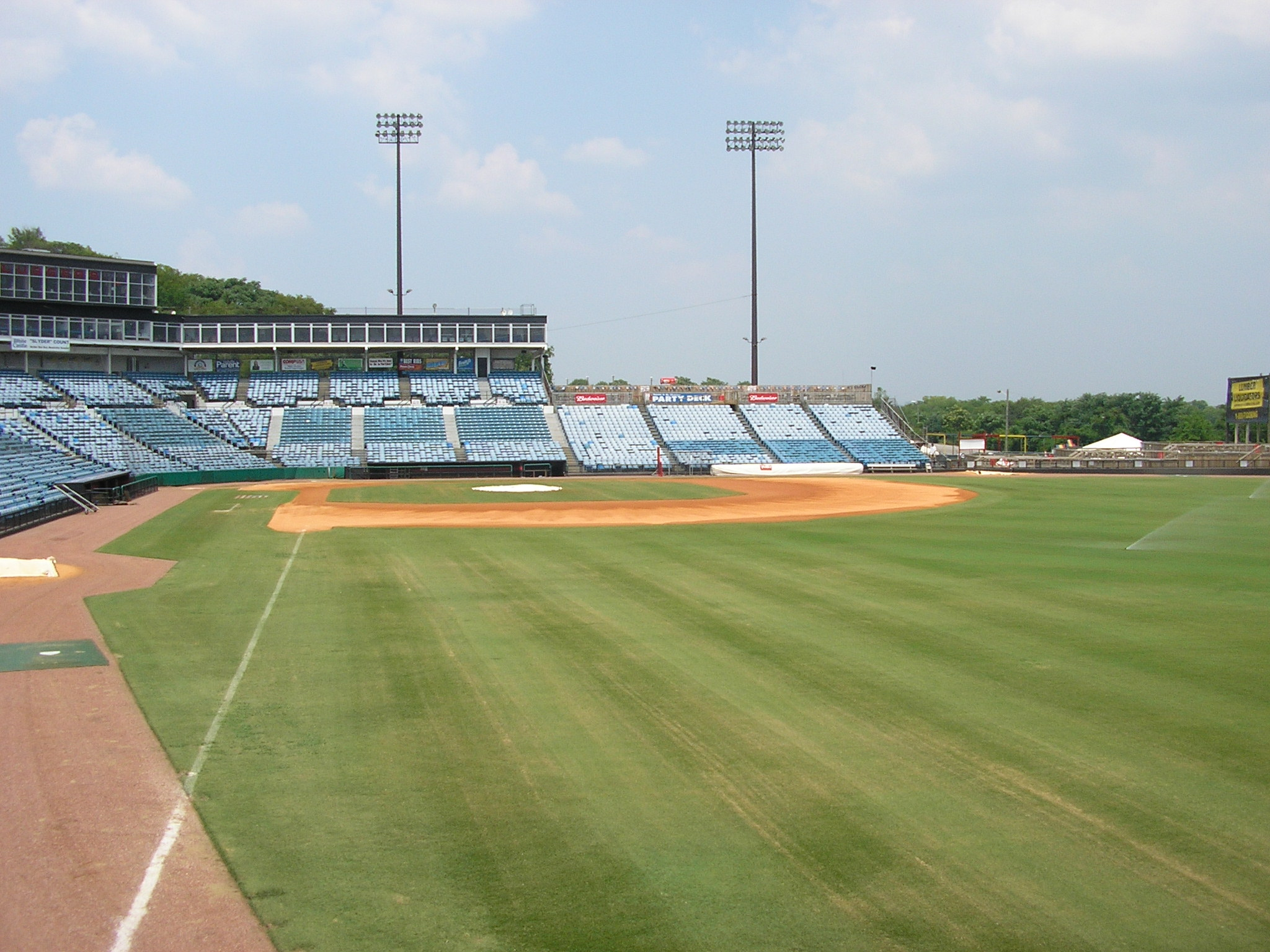
Herschel Greer Stadium

The Sounds originally played at Herschel Greer Stadium from 1978 through 2014. The ballpark, which was demolished in 2019, was located on the grounds of Fort Negley, an American Civil War fortification approximately two miles (3.2 km) south of downtown Nashville. The venue experienced numerous expansions and contractions after its completion in 1978, reaching a capacity of 18,000 spectators at its peak, but seated 10,300 during its final 2014 season. The largest attendance, which also set the Southern League record, occurred on August 18, 1982, when 22,315 people saw the Sounds take on the Columbus Astros, many of them standing in roped-off areas in the outfield. Greer's best-known feature, installed prior to the 1993 season, was a giant 115.6 foot (35.2 m) guitar-shaped scoreboard behind the left-field wall.

Following the construction of newer, relatively luxurious minor league ballparks in the late 1980s, Greer had fallen below the standards set for Triple-A stadiums by professional baseball. At the time, team president Larry Schmittou tried unsuccessfully to convince the city to fund a new ballpark. Throughout the 2000s, the team continued in its attempts to gather approval and financing for a new facility. At one point, First Tennessee Field was planned for construction on the west bank of the Cumberland River in downtown. Disagreements over who would pay for the ballpark repeatedly delayed its opening and eventually resulted in the cancellation of the project altogether. In the meantime, numerous upgrades and repairs were made in order to preserve its functionality until a new stadium could be built. A deal for such a new ballpark was achieved in late 2013. The Sounds played their final game at Greer on August 27, 2014.

=== First Horizon Park (2015–present) ===
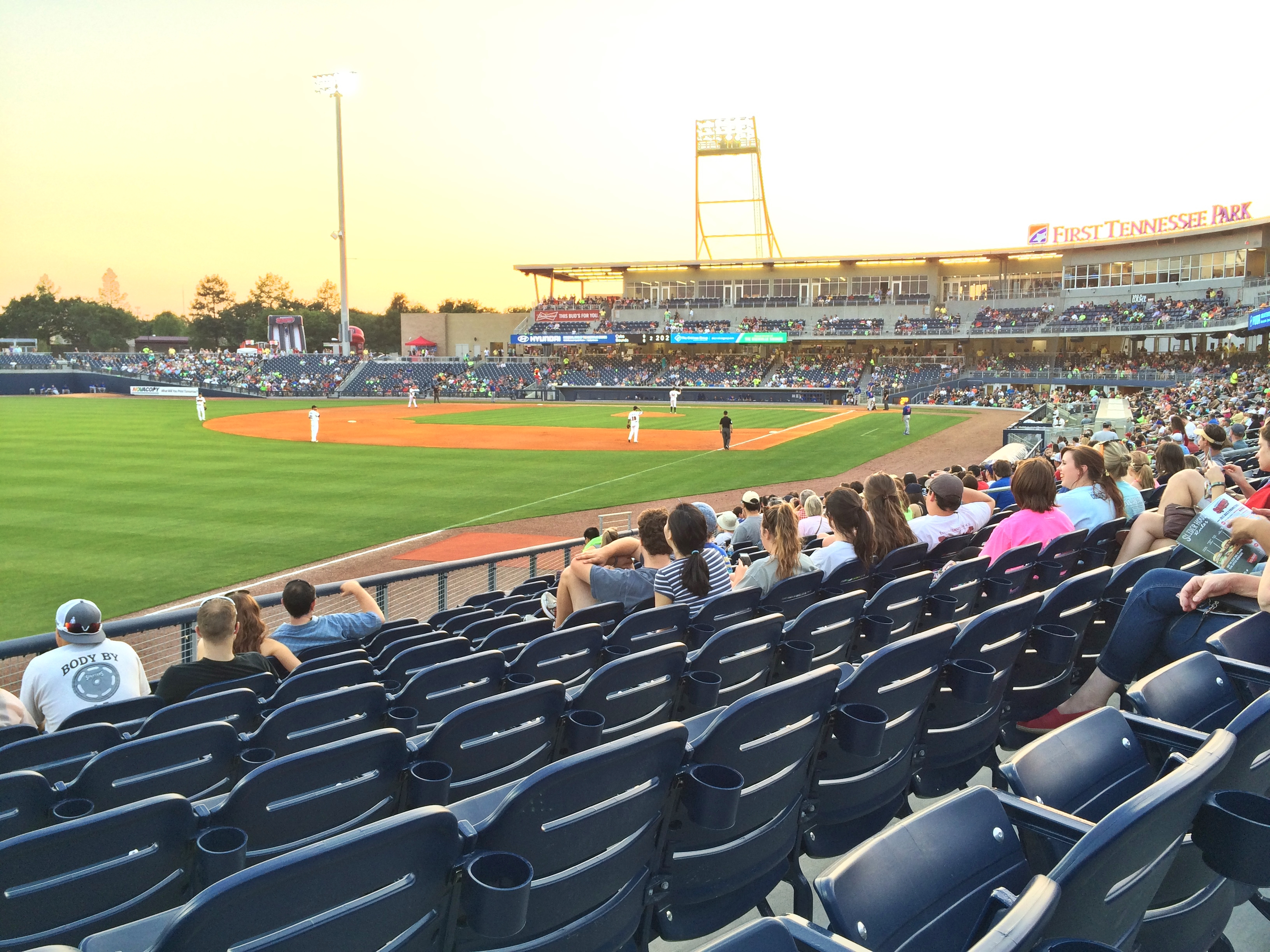
First Horizon Park

The Sounds' current home stadium is First Horizon Park, which opened in 2015 and was known as First Tennessee Park through 2019. The facility is located in downtown Nashville at the location of the former Sulphur Dell ballpark. It has a fixed seating capacity of 8,500 people, but can accommodate up to 10,000 with additional group areas and grass berm seating. The ballpark's attendance record was set on July 16, 2022, when 12,409 people watched a game between the Sounds and the Memphis Redbirds. The stadium features wide concourses with direct views of the playing field. Its design, which incorporates the use of musical and baseball imagery, is meant to connect the park with the city's baseball and musical heritage. Examples include the use of directional signage displaying information on Nashville's former teams and players and the grandstand's light stanchions reminiscent of those found at Sulphur Dell.

One of First Horizon Park's most recognizable features, like Greer Stadium before it, is a 142 by 55 foot (43 by 17 m) guitar-shaped scoreboard beyond the right-field wall. Unlike Greer's guitar, which was only able to display basic in-game information such as the line score, count, and brief player statistics, the larger, modern version is also capable of displaying colorful graphics, animations, player photographs, videos, the batting order, fielding positions, and expanded statistics. Other distinguishing features at the ballpark include The Band Box, an outdoor restaurant and bar which serves variations on traditional ballpark foods, and The Country Club at The Band Box, a 9-hole miniature golf course which exhibits art from different local and regional artists. Since 2016, the Country Legends Race, similar to major league mascot races, such as the Sausage Race, has been a part of the between-innings entertainment at the park. In the middle of the fifth inning, people in oversized foam caricature costumes depicting country musicians Johnny Cash, George Jones, Reba McEntire, and Dolly Parton race around the warning track from center-field, through the home bullpen, and to the start the third base dugout.

== Uniforms ==
The Sounds have utilized three distinct color schemes, five primary logos, and numerous uniforms since beginning play in 1978. Their original red, white, and blue identity reflected Nashville's country music culture, while the switch to red, black, and white in the late 1990s sought to modernize the team's look. A 2015 rebrand reincorporated elements of the city's music ties, which had been largely absent in previous years. The team reworked its identity in 2019, further integrating the city's baseball and musical heritage with the Sounds of the present.

=== 1978–2018 ===
Past Nashville Sounds uniforms

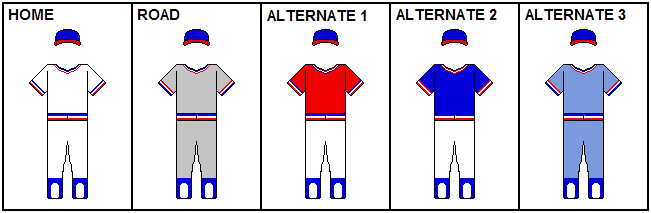
1978–1986

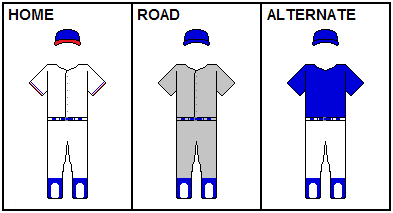
1987–1998

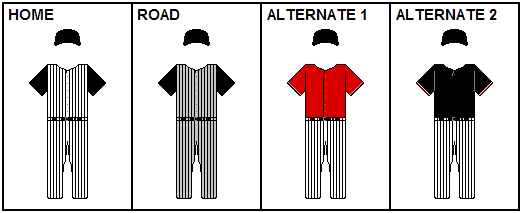
1999–2002

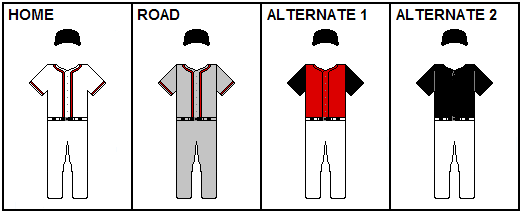
2003–2005

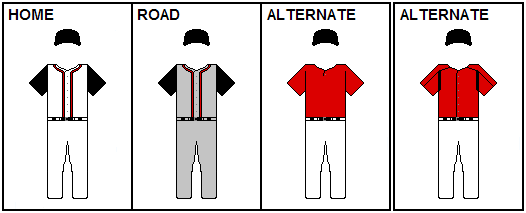
2006–2012

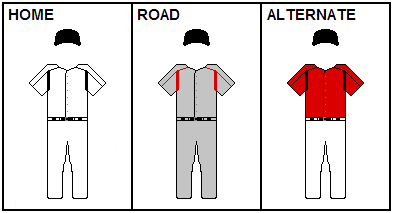
2013–2014

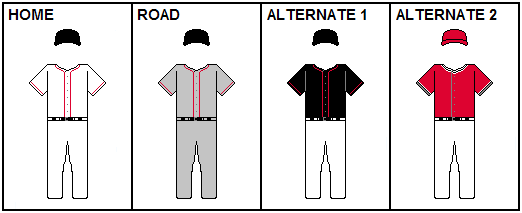
2015–2018

From 1978 to 1986, the team wore white pullover v-neck jerseys for home games, gray for road games, and red, blue, and powder blue as alternates. They had red, white, and blue tri-color bands around the neck, with larger bands at the sleeve openings (blue jerseys had one white band and two red bands). "Sounds" was written across the chest in red-on-blue music note-like script (powder blue jerseys had red-on-white script). Numbers were sewn on the back. Some jerseys during this period bore a Slugger patch on the right sleeve. The team had three sets of pants: white, gray, and powder blue, all with small tri-color stripes down the legs and larger stripes around the waistband. Beginning in the mid-1980s, numbers were also located on the front of jerseys on the player's left below the team name in the same colors. The cap was blue with a red brim bearing a white "N" styled like a music note bordered by red; this was the official team cap from 1978 through the mid-1990s. These first uniforms were modeled after those worn at the time by the Texas Rangers.

From 1987 to 1998, the team wore white button-up jerseys for home games and gray on the road. The home jersey design remained largely similar to its predecessor. "Sounds" was still written across the chest in blue and red music note script; though, the font was changed briefly from 1987 to 1988. Numbers remained on the front in blue-on-red block characters. The player's number was present on the back in red and blue. Names were added in blue some years. Road grays had "Nashville" on the chest but lacked tri-color bands at both the neck and sleeves. During this time, the team added a blue mesh v-neck jersey with the red and white guitar swinger logo on the left chest. Blue belts replaced the pants' wide tri-color stripes. The Sounds continued to wear the original red-billed blue cap with all uniforms until approximately 1993 when a new cap was introduced. This all-blue cap interposed the "N" with the "Slugger" logo. The two caps were worn interchangeably through 1998.

Over the course of the 1998 and 1999 seasons, the team switched to a red and black color scheme. In the latter, uniforms consisted of jerseys with black pinstripes and black sleeves bearing a new music note logo on the left sleeve. White home jerseys had "Sounds" across the chest in red with a white-on-black border using the same font used by the Anaheim Angels at the time. Road grays read "Nashville" on the chest in the same style. Both had the player's number sewn on the back in block characters of the same colors. An alternate solid red jersey with black and gray trim around the sleeve openings and a music note logo on the left chest was also worn. A black alternate had red and white trim at the sleeve openings and a similar music note logo on the left chest. All four jerseys were paired with pinstriped pants. Caps were black with the circular music note logo.

From 2003 to 2005, Nashville switched to solid-colored jerseys and pants. "Sounds" was written across the chest in red script surrounded by black with the player's number on the front below the team name in red-on-black block characters. Red and black piping ran around sleeve openings and along the row of buttons going up and down the front and around the neck. The left sleeve had the music note logo. Pants had the same piping going down the legs on the outside and were paired with black belts. The road gray uniform set was otherwise identical, but it had "Nashville" across the front. A sleeveless red alternate jersey with black piping and similar white-on-black markings was worn in this period. They also continued use of the previous generation's black alternate. The official home and road caps worn from 2003 to 2014 were black with a red and white music note logo.

From 2006 to 2012, the team's jerseys were similar to those of the previous era, but lacked sleeves and the player's number on the front. These vest-like jerseys were worn over black shirts of varying sleeve lengths. The player's name was written on the back in black block characters; numbers were also displayed in large red-on-black characters. The matching road jerseys initially read "Sounds" across the chest but were later changed to "Nashville"; these usually lacked the player's name on the back. A Milwaukee Brewers logo was added to the front left shoulder in 2007. An alternate red mesh jersey with yellow, white, and black markings was worn from 2006 to 2007. A different red alternate was introduced in 2010. These were similar to the primary home and road mesh jerseys the team would adopt in 2013, but were red with black underarm sections and piping. "Sounds" was displayed across the chest in white-on-black script. A Brewers logo was located on the front left shoulder, and the back numbers were white-on-black. All uniforms continued to be topped off with black caps with a red and white music note logo.

From 2013 to 2014, jerseys were made of mesh material with black sections at the armpits and a single line of black piping going down the sleeves and across the shoulders to the neck. A Brewers logo was sewn on the left sleeve. "Sounds" was written across the chest of home jerseys in the same red/black script used since 2003. The player's name was displayed on the back in black block characters; numbers were also shown in large red-on-black digits. Road jerseys were the same, but with "Nashville" across the chest, red underarm sections and piping, and no name on the back. The team continued to wear the previous red alternate of the same style. All were paired with the black cap bearing the red and white music note logo.

From 2015 to 2018, home whites had single lines of red piping around the sleeve openings and up the front going around the neck. "Sounds" was displayed on the chest in red letters which resembled the sound holes on a guitar with a silver-on-black border. A swinging guitar logo was located on the left sleeve, while a green Oakland Athletics elephant logo was on the right. The player's name was sewn on the back in black block characters with his number displayed below in red sound-hole lettering with a silver border and black drop shadow. White pants with a line of red piping going up the sides were worn with black belts. The home cap was black with the primary "N" guitar pick logo. Gray road uniforms were identical with only a few exceptions: "Nashville" on the chest, pants lacking any piping, and a cap with an "S" guitar pick logo. An alternate black jersey with "Music City" on the front, red piping, no name on the reverse, and "Nashville" embroidered in red letters under the Athletics sleeve logo was also worn. A second set of alternates, introduced in 2016, were sublimation-printed red jerseys with black and white bands at the neck and bands of silver, black, and white around the sleeve openings. A guitar's fret and headstock extended upward from these bands on each sleeve. "Nashville" appeared on the chest in white sound-hole lettering bordered by silver and black. The player's number was located below the city's name and on the back in silver characters with a white border and black drop shadow.

=== 2019–present ===
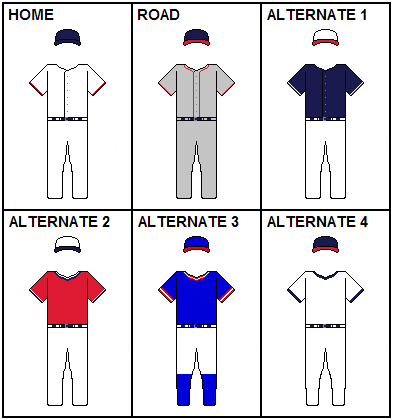
Current Nashville Sounds uniforms

Since the 2019 season, home jerseys have been white with "NASH" boldly arched across the chest in navy blue with the player's number in red under the name on the left side. The sleeves have thin navy and red bands at the openings with six thin red stripes, reminiscent of guitar strings, running from the openings up the shoulders before terminating near the collar. The left side bears a navy "NASH" pick logo set against the strings. The player's name is displayed in black on the back with the number below in red. The home pants, worn with navy belts, are white with a pair of navy and red stripes running down the outsides. The home cap is all navy with a red "N" icon, styled like a guitar or violin's F-hole, outlined in white.

Road grays have lines of red piping around the neck and along the row of buttons going up the chest with a red and white "N" icon on the left side and the player's number on the right in the same colors. Each sleeve has a thin red band at the opening with a secondary logo displaying the Sounds' script wordmark in navy set against a red baseball on the left sleeve. The player's number is displayed on the back in red with a white border. Gray pants, worn with navy belts, have the same navy/red stripes as the home pants. The road cap has a red bill but is otherwise identical to the home cap.

The navy blue alternate has "Nashville" written across the chest in an F-hole-styled red font with a white outline. Similar to the home whites, these have red and white bands at the openings and the guitar strings on the sleeves and behind the "NASH" pick are white. The player's number is displayed on the back in red with a white border. The alternate cap is navy with a white front panel, red bill, and a red "N" icon outlined in navy.

The red alternate is a v-neck pullover with "Sounds" on the chest in navy bordered by white in the F-hole script. The player's number is below the team name in navy outlined in white. The sleeves have navy and white bands at the openings, white strings going up the sides, and a "NASH" pick logo on the left. A larger navy stripe and smaller white stripe go around the neck opening. The player's number is displayed on the back in navy with a white border. The cap is navy with a white front panel bearing three navy stars arranged like those on the flag of Tennessee set in a red-outlined home plate.

Throwback uniforms are worn for Thursday home games in conjunction with Throwback Thursday promotions. The jerseys, similar to those worn by early Sounds teams, are blue pullover v-necks with bands of red and white at the neck and sleeve openings. "Sounds" is written across the chest in white-on-red music note-like script, with the player's number below on the left in white block characters with red borders. The right sleeve bears the "Slugger" logo. White pants are worn with blue belts. Some players wear high pants paired with either blue socks or stirrups. The cap is blue with a red brim, displaying an "N" styled like an eighth note in white bordered by red.

Other specialty jerseys are worn at various times throughout the season, such as when the Sounds take the field as the Vihuelas de Nashville in Copa de la Diversión games, the Nashville Brewskis as a nod to their major league affiliate Milwaukee Brewers, or the Nashville Elite Giants to honor the Negro league team of the same name.

== Radio and television ==
During the inaugural season of 1978, Sounds games were broadcast on radio by Monte Hale. He was followed by Bob Jamison (1979–1990), Steve Carroll (1991–1995), Steve Selby (1996–1999), Chuck Valenches (2000–2009), and Stu Paul (2010–2011). Jeff Hem, the team's longest-tenured announcer, has been the lead broadcaster since 2012.

All Sounds home and road games are broadcast on 94.9 FM The Fan (AM 830). Live audio broadcasts are also available online through the team's website and the Minor League Baseball mobile app. Games can be viewed through the MLB.TV and Bally Sports Live streaming services, with the home team's audio provided by radio simulcast.

== Mascots ==
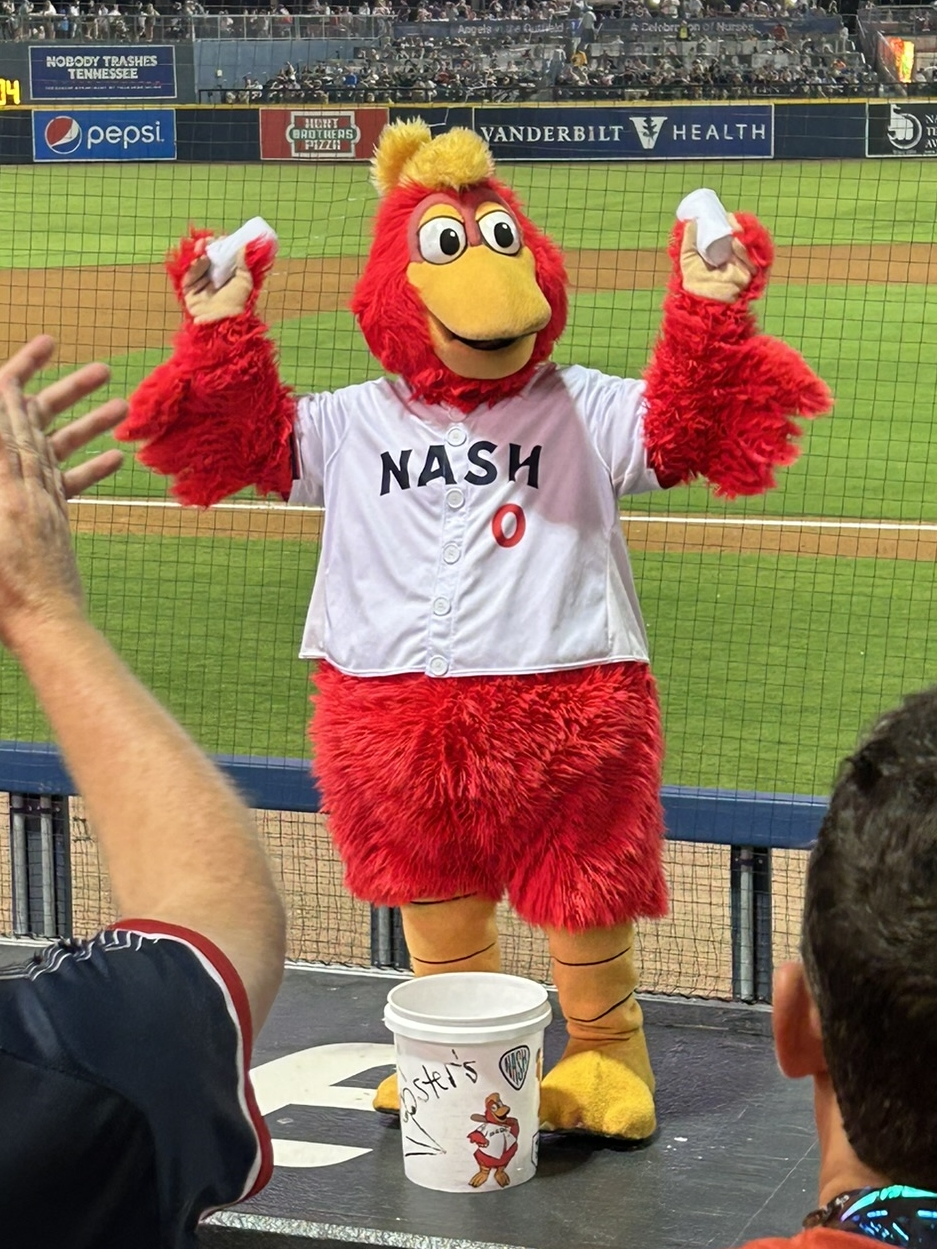
Booster, the team mascot

The Nashville Sounds' mascot is an anthropomorphic rooster named Booster. He is bright red with yellow legs, beak, comb, and palms and red, orange, and yellow tail feathers resembling flames. He wears the same jerseys as the team with the number zero. He made his debut on April 17, 2015, at the Sounds' first game at First Tennessee Park. His name refers to "boosting" or building enthusiasm for the team, while his appearance is a play on Nashville hot chicken.

The first Sounds mascot was introduced during the team's inaugural 1978 season. Homer Horsehide resembled their major league affiliate's mascot—Mr. Red of the Cincinnati Reds. The character was human in appearance, except for an oversized anthropomorphized baseball in place of a human head. The mustachioed mascot donned a uniform identical to that of Sounds players. Homer continued as the team mascot through at least 1982. From 1995 to mid 1996, the mascot was a lime-green dinosaur named Champ, who was borrowed from the New York–Penn League's Vermont Expos.

An anthropomorphic cougar named Ozzie was the team's mascot from 1997 to 2014. The original Ozzie came from the Midwest League's Kane County Cougars, which were owned by the same group that owned the Sounds and had an extra mascot costume. The surplus cougar outfit was sent to Nashville, and, after building a fan following during his first season, team management decided to make Ozzie the permanent mascot. The original costume was brown, but a new muscular yellow costume was introduced in 1998. Ozzie wore the same style of uniform as the team, but with no hat. He was retired when the Sounds left Greer Stadium in 2014, although he continued to make appearances during the 2014 to 2015 offseason.

== Roster ==
Nashville Sounds roster
Players		Coaches/Other
Pitchers: 15 Kaleb Bowman; -- Will Childers; 34 Tyson Hardin; 49 Edwin Jiminez; 47 Jared Koenig; 52 Tate Kuehner; -- Ben Moore; 40 Carlos Rodríguez; 32 Cameron Wagoner; 38 Brett Wichrowski	Catchers Infielders: 57 Luke Adams; 45 Blake Burke; 5 Daniel Guilarte; 1 Ethan Murray; 10 Jonathan Ornelas; 25 Brock Wilken; 7 Jett Williams; Outfielders: 29 Eric Brown Jr.	Manager: 16 Rick Sweet; Coaches: 59 Eric Bunnell; -- Tim Doherty (hitting); -- Zachary Jones (hitting); -- Bryan Leslie (pitching); -- Tyler Thornburg (pitching); 24 David Tufo (bench); 7-day injured list; * On Milwaukee Brewers 40-man roster; ~ Development list; # Rehab assignment; ∞ Reserve list; ‡ Restricted list; § Suspended list; † Temporarily inactive list; Roster updated November 15, 2026; Transactions; → More rosters: MiLB • International League; → Milwaukee Brewers minor league players

== Achievements ==
=== Awards ===
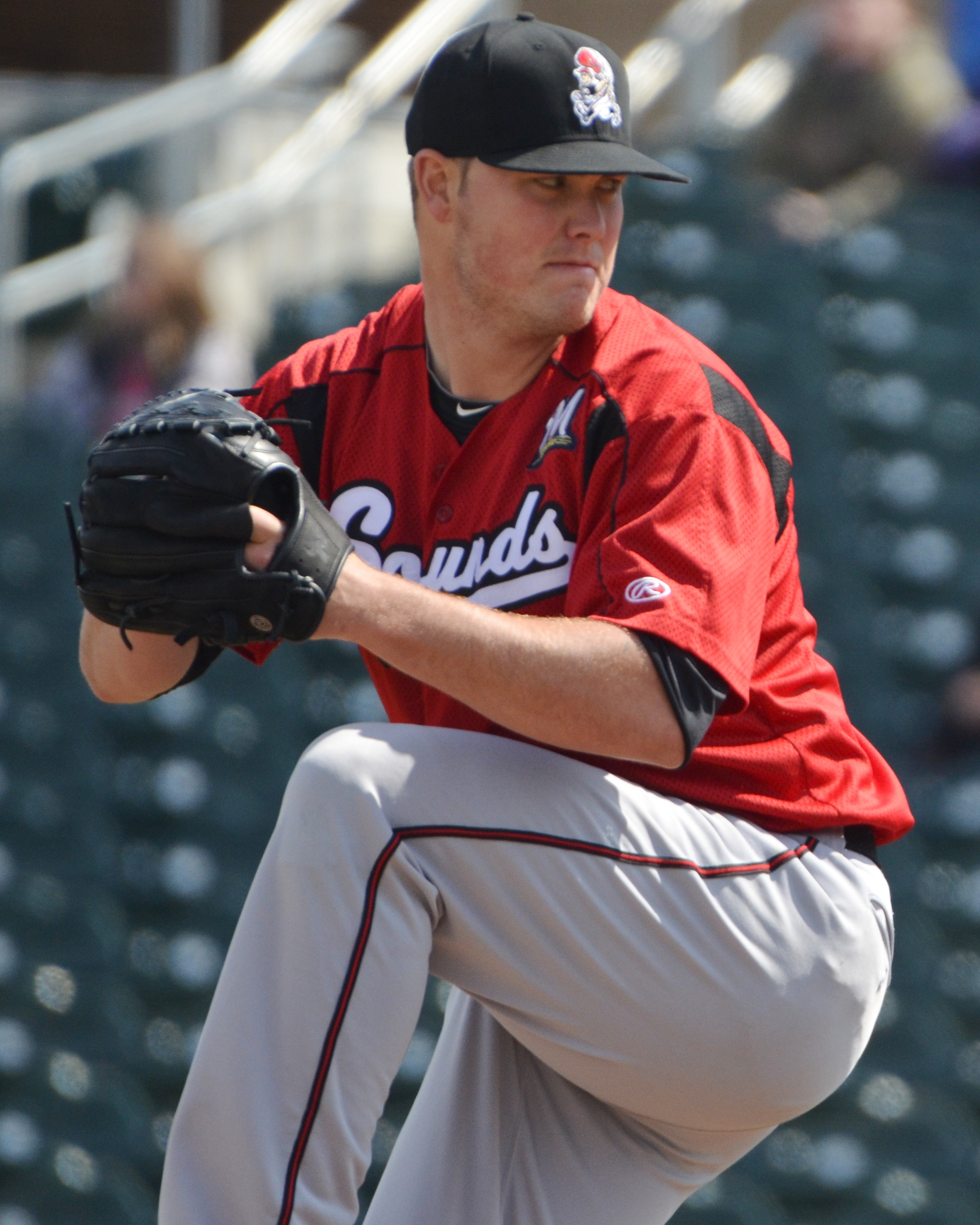
Jimmy Nelson won the PCL Pitcher of the Year Award in 2014.

Sixteen players have won league awards in recognition for their performance with the Sounds. Three players have won league Most Valuable Player (MVP) awards. Steve Balboni (1980) and Brian Dayett (1982) won the Southern League MVP Award, and Magglio Ordóñez (1997) won the American Association MVP Award. Eleven players have won Pitcher of the Year honors. Bruce Berenyi (1978), Geoff Combe (1979), Andy McGaffigan (1980), Jamie Werly (1981), and Stefan Wever (1982) were selected for the Southern League Most Outstanding Pitcher Award. Chris Hammond (1990) and Scott Ruffcorn (1994) won the American Association Most Valuable Pitcher Award. R. A. Dickey (2007), Johnny Hellweg (2013), and Jimmy Nelson (2014) were selected for the Pacific Coast League Pitcher of the Year Award. Robert Gasser (2023) and Chad Patrick (2024) have won the International League Pitcher of the Year Award. Jeff Abbott (1996) and Magglio Ordóñez (1997) won the American Association Rookie of the Year Award.

Five managers have been selected as their league's Manager of the Year. Stump Merrill (1980) won the Southern League Manager of the Year Award. Rick Renick (1993 and 1996) won the American Association Manager of the Year Award. Frank Kremblas (2007) and Steve Scarsone (2016) won the Pacific Coast League Manager of the Year Award. Rick Sweet (2022) has won the International League Manager of the Year Award.

Seven Sounds have been selected to participate in the All-Star Futures Game. Seventy-six players were selected for midseason All-Star teams. Four of these were chosen as the MVP for their contributions in All-Star games: Duane Walker (1979), Ray Durham (1994), Magglio Ordóñez (1997), and Renato Núñez (2017). Fifty-four players have been named to postseason All-Star teams.

=== Retired numbers ===
The Sounds have honored three players by retiring their uniform numbers. This ensures that the number will be associated with one player of particular importance to the team. An additional number, 42, was retired throughout professional baseball in 1997 to honor Jackie Robinson, the first African American to play in Major League Baseball in the modern era. The Sounds' retired numbers are displayed on the concourse near the home plate entrance at First Horizon Park.

The number 00 was retired in 1991 in honor of Skeeter Barnes, a third baseman in 1979 and primarily an outfielder from 1988 to 1990. Barnes was a 1989 Triple-A All-Star and holds the franchise career records for games played, at bats, and hits. The number 18 was retired to honor Don Mattingly in 1999. Though only a Sound for one season, the first baseman led the 1981 team in games played, hits, doubles, and RBI. Additionally, Mattingly was named to the Southern League All-Star team and was selected as the New York Yankees' Minor League Player of the Year. The number 17 was retired in 2022 to honor Tim Dillard, a pitcher from 2007 to 2014 and in 2019. Over nine seasons in which he primarily appeared as a reliever, Dillard set the career records for wins, games pitched, innings pitched, and strikeouts.

Retired numbers
The number "00" in navy blue set against a white circle with a red and navy border	The number "17" in navy blue set against a white circle with a red and navy border	The number "18" in navy blue set against a white circle with a red and navy border	The number "42" in navy blue set against a white circle with a red and navy border
Skeeter Barnes	Tim Dillard	Don Mattingly	Jackie Robinson
OF / 3B / 1B; 1979, 1988–1990; Retired 1991	P 2007–2014, 2019; Retired July 29, 2022	1B / OF; 1981; Retired August 12, 1999	Retired throughout professional baseball on April 15, 1997

=== Hall of Famers ===
Four former Sounds have been elected to the National Baseball Hall of Fame. Closer Trevor Hoffman, who was inducted in 2018, played the majority of the 1992 season with Nashville while working his way up through the Cincinnati Reds organization. He later made two major league rehabilitation appearances while with the Milwaukee Brewers in 2009. Two other Hall of Fame players appeared in games for Nashville solely on rehab assignments. Shortstop Barry Larkin, who was inducted in 2012, appeared in two games in 1989. Outfielder Tim Raines, who played three games with Nashville in 1993, was inducted in 2017. Hoyt Wilhelm, the Sounds' pitching coach from 1982 to 1984, was inducted in 1985.

The Sounds are also represented in the Southern League Hall of Fame. Larry Schmittou, who helped start the team in 1978 and was an executive and owner through 1996, was inducted in 2016.

== Managers ==
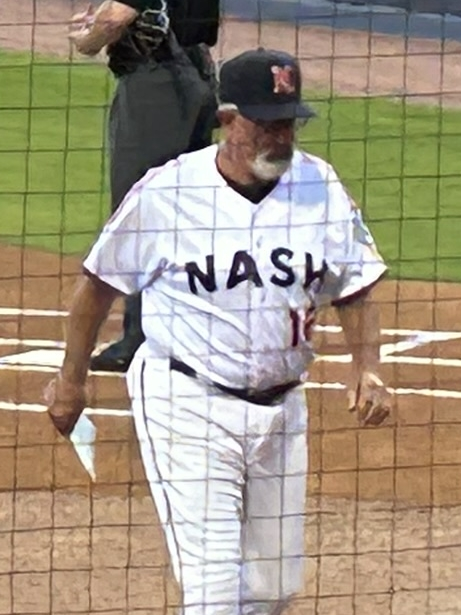
Rick Sweet, the Sounds' manager in 2014 and since 2021, was the recipient of the 2022 International League Manager of the Year Award.

Over the course of 48 seasons, the Nashville Sounds have been led by 29 managers. Three have guided the team to win their league's championship. George Scherger (1979) and Johnny Oates (1982) led the team to win Southern League championships, and Frank Kremblas (2005) led them to win the championship of the Pacific Coast League. Rick Sweet, who previously managed the team in 2014, has been the Sounds' manager since 2021. He is the longest-tenured manager in team history, having guided the team for 1,012 games across seven seasons. The manager with the highest winning percentage over a full season or more is Stump Merrill, who led the Sounds to a .622 winning percentage from 1980 to 1981.

Managerial records (last five managers)
Manager	Season(s)	Regular-season				Postseason				Ref.
Manager	Season(s)	Games	Wins	Losses	Win %	Apps.	Wins	Losses	Win %	Ref.
Ryan Christenson	2017	139	68	71	.489	—	—	—	—	
Fran Riordan	2018	140	72	68	.514	—	—	—	—	
Jason Wood	2019	138	66	72	.478	—	—	—	—	
Darwin Barney	2020	Season cancelled (COVID-19 pandemic)								
Rick Sweet	2021–2026	868	487	381	.561	1	0	1	.000	
Totals	10 seasons	1,285	693	592	.539	1	0	1	.000	—

== See also ==
- History of professional baseball in Nashville, Tennessee
- Nashville Sounds owners and executives
