= WMGC (AM) =

- Murfreesboro, Tennessee; United States
- Broadcast area: Nashville, Tennessee
- Frequency: 810 kHz
- Branding: El Jefe

Programming
- Format: Spanish Variety
- Affiliations: Nashville SC

Ownership
- Owner: Radio 810 Nashville, Limited

History
- First air date: 1981
- Former call signs: WMTS (1981–1995); WAPB (1995–1999)

Technical information
- Licensing authority: FCC
- Facility ID: 12313
- Class: D
- Power: 5,000 watts day 6 watts night
- Transmitter coordinates: 35°50′14″N 86°25′00″W
- Translators: 96.7 W244CW (Murfreesboro); 105.3 W287DK (Brentwood)

Links
- Public license information: Public file; LMS
- Website: eljefe967fm.com

WMGC (810 kHz, "El Jefe") is an AM radio station broadcasting a Spanish Variety music format. Licensed to Murfreesboro, Tennessee, United States, the station is currently owned by Radio 810 Nashville, Limited.
