= List of Nashville Sounds owners and executives =

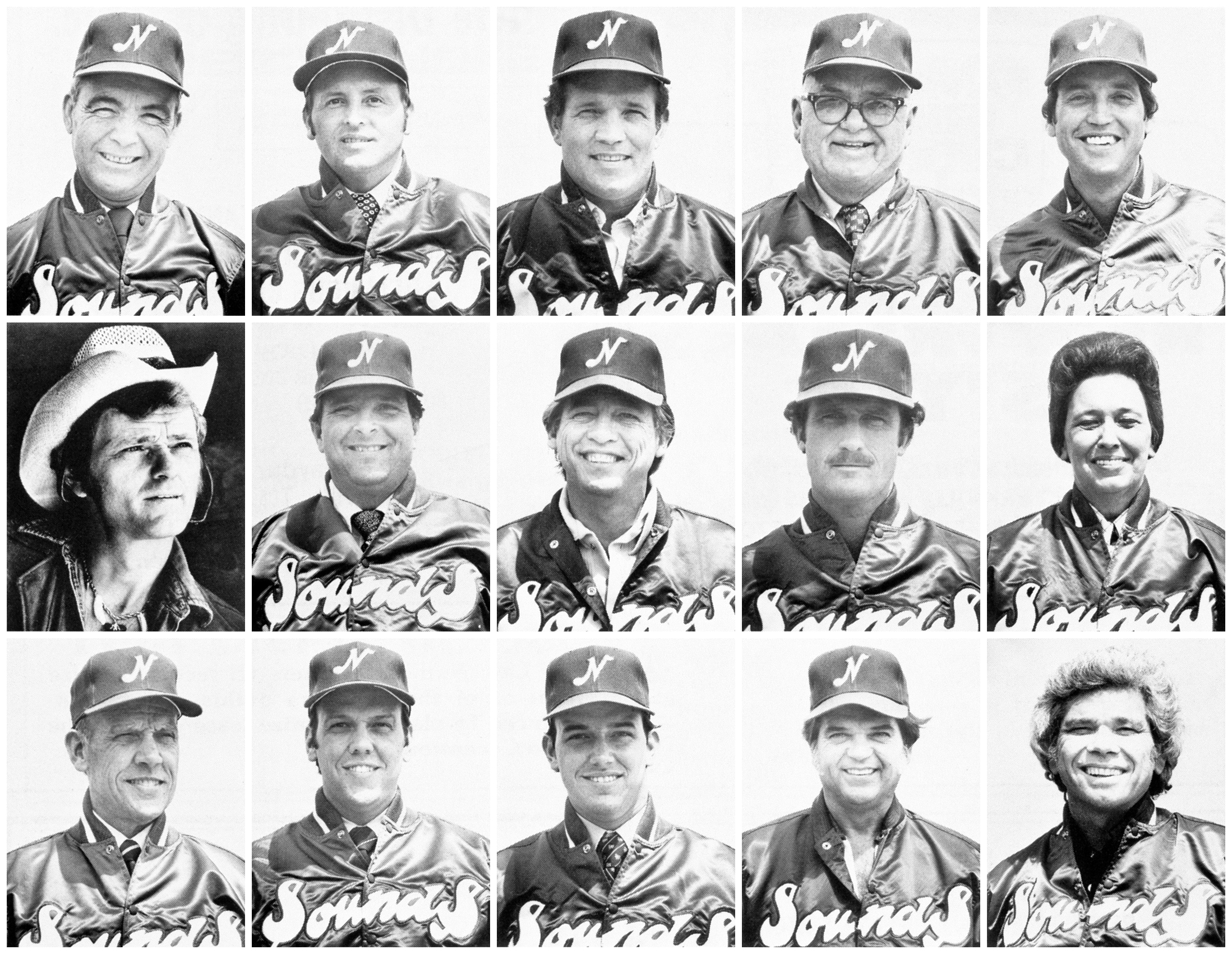
The Nashville Sounds ownership group consisted of 15 shareholders in their inaugural 1978 season. (Top row, from left: Bob Elliott, Billy Griggs, Jimmy Miller, Walter Nipper, Farrell Owens; Middle row: Jerry Reed, Larry Schmittou, Cal Smith, Gene Smith, Marcella Smith; Bottom row: Reese Smith Jr., Reese Smith III, Steven Smith, Conway Twitty, and L. E. White)

The Nashville Sounds Minor League Baseball team has played in Nashville, Tennessee, since being established in 1978 as an expansion team of the Double-A Southern League. They moved up to Triple-A in 1985 as members of the American Association, joined the Pacific Coast League in 1998, and were placed in the Triple-A East in 2021 before it was renamed the International League in 2022. The Sounds were originally owned by a local group, headed by Larry Schmittou, which included baseball figures, country musicians, and businessmen. Shares in the team have subsequently changed hands multiple times. Since 2009, the Sounds have been owned by MFP Baseball, composed of real estate investors Masahiro Honzawa and Frank Ward.

In the franchise's history, 16 general managers (GMs) have been employed to run the team's day-to-day business operations. Among the responsibilities of the general manager are overseeing ticket and advertising sales, developing corporate relationships, managing front office and game-day staff, and maintaining the team's player development license with their Major League Baseball affiliate. The longest-tenured general manager is Larry Schmittou with 13 years of service to the team in that role from 1980 to 1982 and 1987 to 1996. Danielle Gaw has been the Sounds' GM since October 2026.

== Owners ==
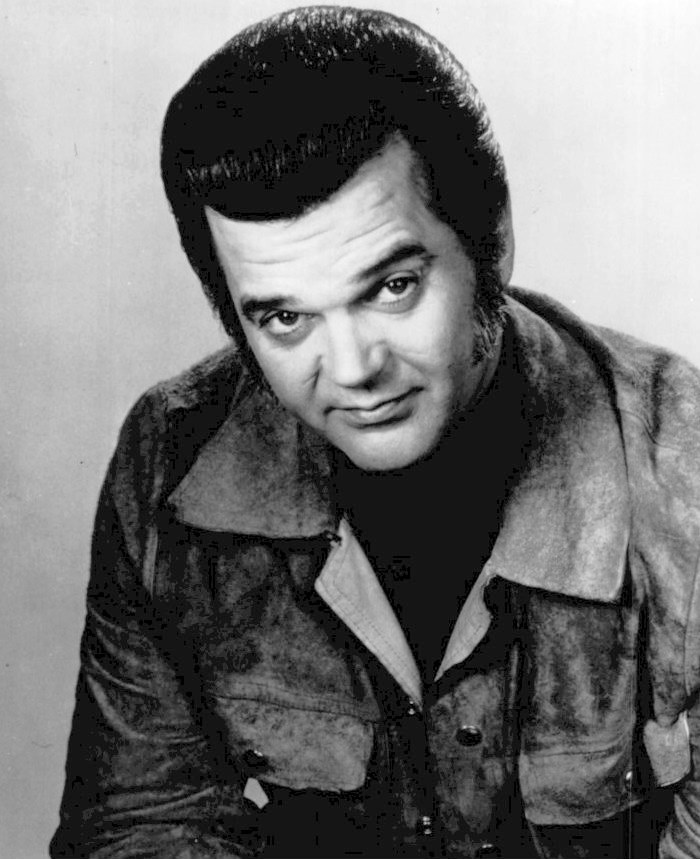
Country musician Conway Twitty helped spearhead the original Sounds investment group along with Larry Schmittou.

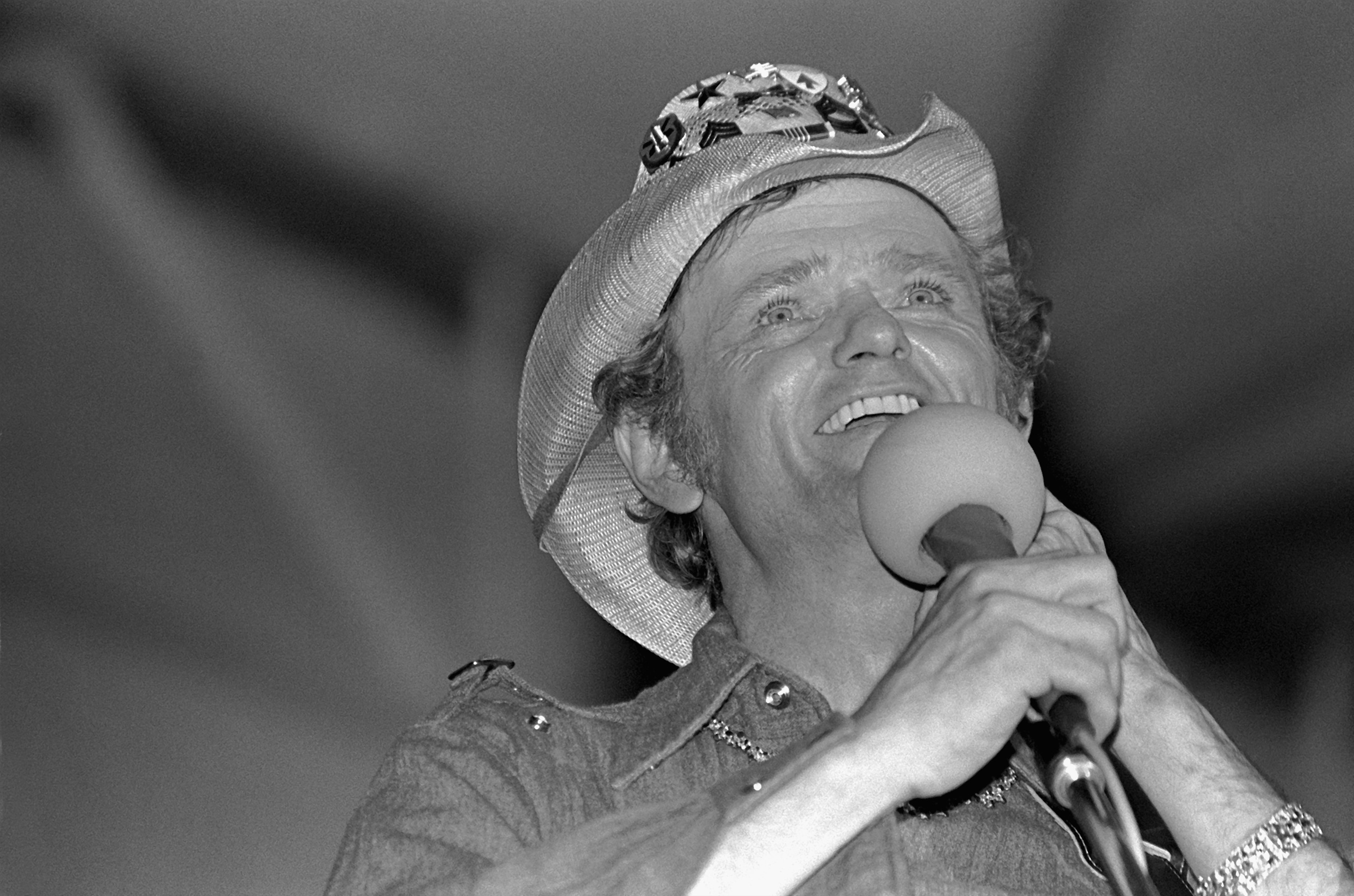
Jerry Reed, one of several country musicians involved with the Sounds, was a part of the original investment group.

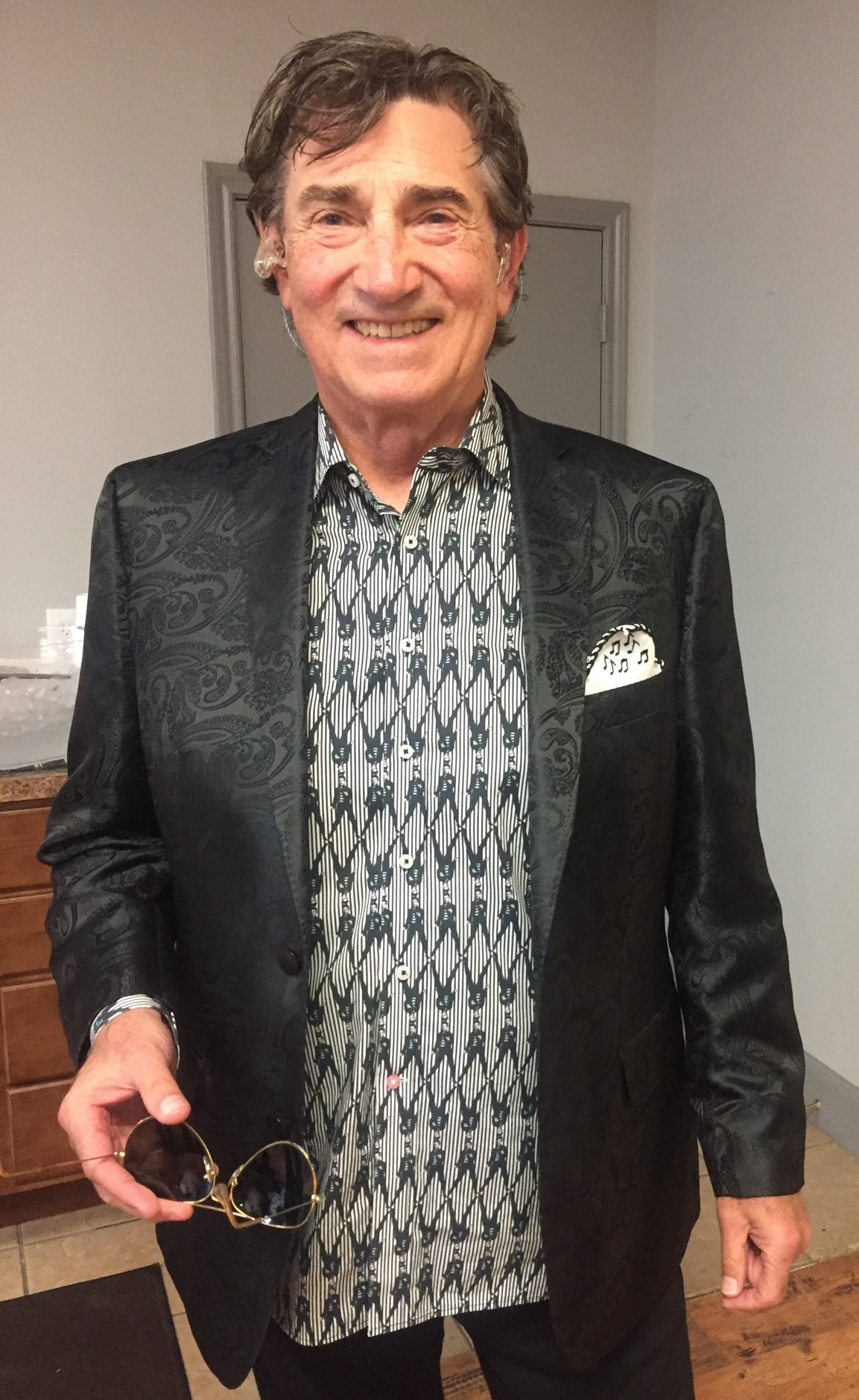
Richard Sterban, bass singer of The Oak Ridge Boys, was a long-time shareholder.

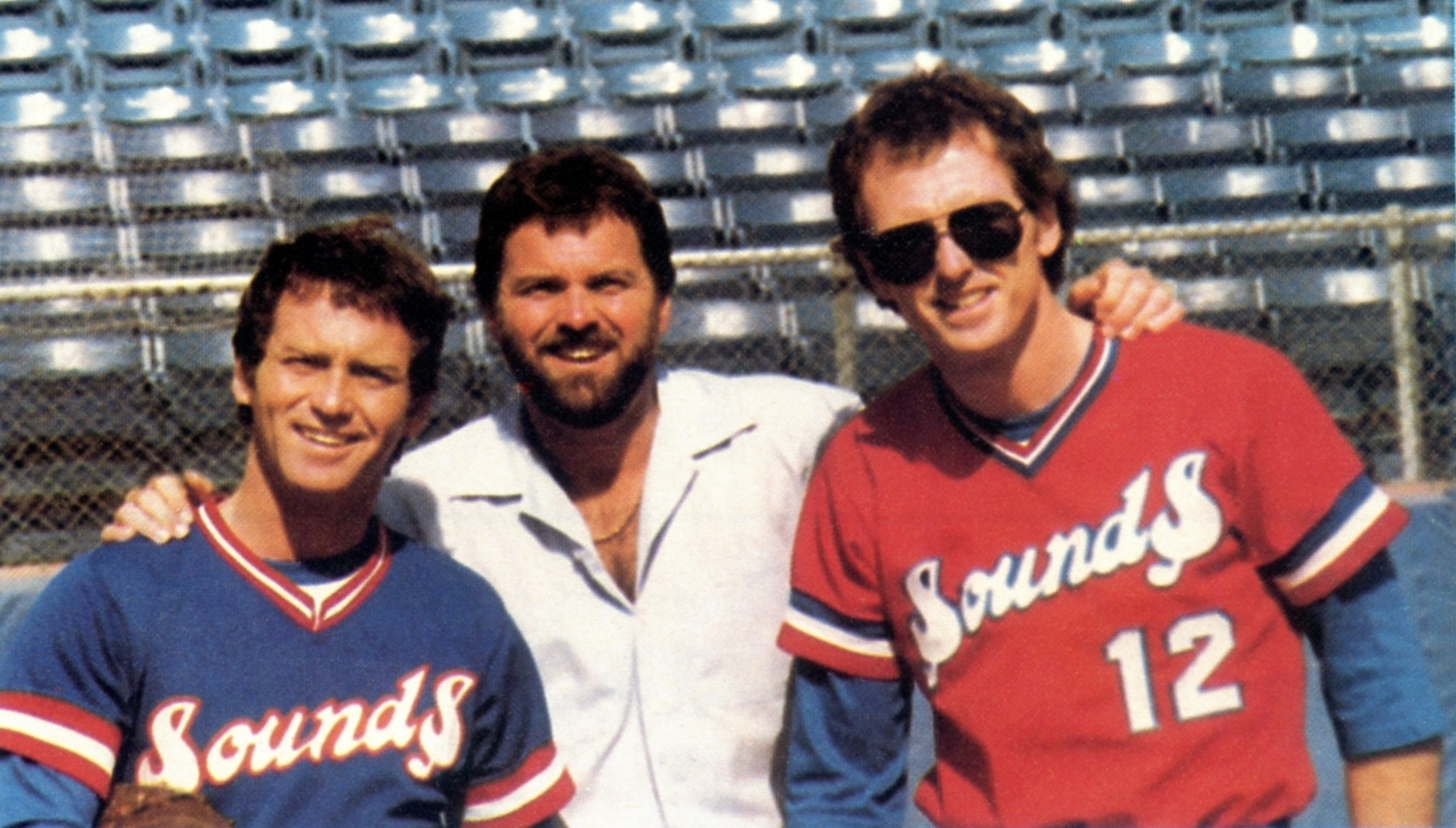
Larry Gatlin (left) owned shares in the Sounds from 1985 to 1990.

Vanderbilt Commodores head baseball coach Larry Schmittou, with help from country musician Conway Twitty, put together a group of investors including other country artists Cal Smith, Jerry Reed, and L. E. White, as well as other Nashvillians, to finance the construction of Herschel Greer Stadium and the purchase of a minor league team in advance of the 1978 season. Twenty shares valued at US$15,000 each were issued; Schmittou purchased two shares, or 10 percent of the team, and Twitty purchased four shares for a 20 percent stake. Shares were bought, sold, and inherited over the course of the next 18 years, but the Sounds largely remained a locally owned franchise. By 1996, Schmittou (30 percent), Walter Nipper (29 percent), and brothers Mark, Reese III, and Stephen Smith (30 percent) had become the primary shareholders, with the remaining 11 percent in the hands of six minority partners.

Following the 1996 season, Schmittou and Nipper sold their combined 59 percent interest for an estimated $4 million to Chicago businessmen Al Gordon, Mike Murtaugh, and Mike Woleben, who operated as American Sports Enterprises. Three years later, Gordon bought out his partners, who had acquired an additional 21 percent stake from other investors, and formed AmeriSports Companies as a parent company for the Sounds and his other sports holdings. Gordon and the remaining minority partners, including the Smith brothers and Richard Sterban of the country music group The Oak Ridge Boys, sold their interests after the 2008 season to MFP Baseball, consisting of New York City-based real estate investors Masahiro Honzawa, Steve Posner, and Frank Ward, for an estimated $20 million. Honzawa and Ward bought out Posner's share following the 2011 season.

Key
| * | Indicates a new owner since the previous group |

Owners
| No. | Owners | Season(s) | Ref(s). |
|---|---|---|---|
| 1 | Bob Elliot, Billy Griggs, Jimmy Miller, Walter Nipper, Farrell Owens, Jerry Reed, Larry Schmittou, Cal Smith, Smith family (Gene Smith, Marcella Smith, Reese Smith Jr., Reese Smith III, Stephen Smith), Conway Twitty, L. E. White | 1978 | |
| 2 | Bob Elliot, Billy Griggs, Jimmy Miller, Walter Nipper, Farrell Owens, Jerry Reed, Larry Schmittou, Cal Smith, Smith family (Gene Smith, Marcella Smith, Reese Smith Jr., Reese Smith III, Stephen Smith), Richard Sterban*, Conway Twitty, L. E. White | 1979–1984 | |
| 3 | Bob Elliot, Larry Gatlin*, Billy Griggs, Jimmy Miller, Walter Nipper, Farrell Owens, Jerry Reed, Larry Schmittou, Cal Smith, Smith family (Gene Smith, Mark Smith*, Reese Smith Jr., Reese Smith III, Stephen Smith), Richard Sterban, Conway Twitty | 1985 | |
| 4 | Larry Gatlin, Walter Nipper, Jerry Reed, Larry Schmittou, Cal Smith, Smith family (Mark Smith, Reese Smith Jr., Reese Smith III, Stephen Smith), Richard Sterban, Conway Twitty | 1986–1988 | |
| 5 | Bob Burgess*, Darrell Evans*, Larry Gatlin, Walter Nipper, Jerry Reed, Larry Schmittou, Smith family (Mark Smith, Reese Smith Jr., Reese Smith III, Stephen Smith), Gary Spicer*, Richard Sterban, Conway Twitty | 1989 | |
| 6 | Bob Burgess, Darrell Evans, Larry Gatlin, Walter Nipper, Jerry Reed, Larry Schmittou, Smith family (Mark Smith, Reese Smith Jr., Reese Smith III, Stephen Smith), Gary Spicer, Richard Sterban | 1990 | |
| 7 | D. Roscoe Buttrey family*, Lew Conner*, E. Bronson Ingram II*, Walter Nipper, Jerry Reed, Larry Schmittou, Smith family (Reese Smith Jr., Reese Smith III, Stephen Smith), Richard Sterban, William Wilson* | 1991 | |
| 8 | D. Roscoe Buttrey family, Lew Conner, E. Bronson Ingram II, Walter Nipper, Jerry Reed, Larry Schmittou, Smith family (Reese Smith III, Stephen Smith), Richard Sterban, William Wilson | 1992 | |
| 9 | D. Roscoe Buttrey family, Lew Conner, E. Bronson Ingram II, Walter Nipper, Jerry Reed, Larry Schmittou, Smith family (Mark Smith*, Reese Smith III, Stephen Smith), Richard Sterban, William Wilson | 1993–1995 | |
| 10 | D. Roscoe Buttrey family, Lew Conner, Martha Ingram*, Walter Nipper, Jerry Reed, Larry Schmittou, Smith family (Mark Smith, Reese Smith III, Stephen Smith), Richard Sterban, William Wilson | 1996 | |
| 11 | Majority: Al Gordon*, Mike Murtaugh*, Mike Woleben* Minority: D. Roscoe Buttrey family, Lew Conner, Martha Ingram, Jerry Reed, Smith family (Mark Smith, Reese Smith III, Stephen Smith), Richard Sterban, William Wilson | 1997–1998 | |
| 12 | Majority: Al Gordon Minority: Smith family, Richard Sterban, other partners | 1999–2008 | |
| 13 | Masahiro Honzawa*, Steve Posner*, Frank Ward* | 2009–2011 | |
| 14 | Masahiro Honzawa, Frank Ward | 2012–present | |

== General managers ==
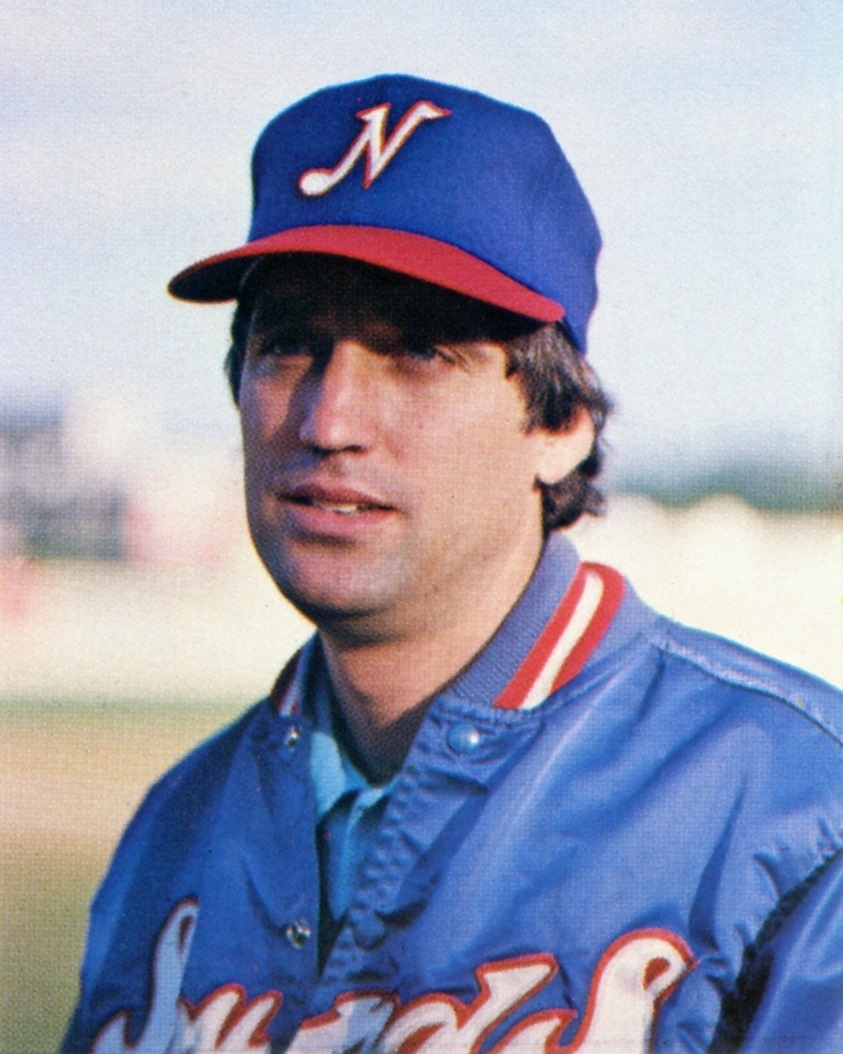
Farrell Owens was the Sounds' general manager in their first two seasons (1978–1979).

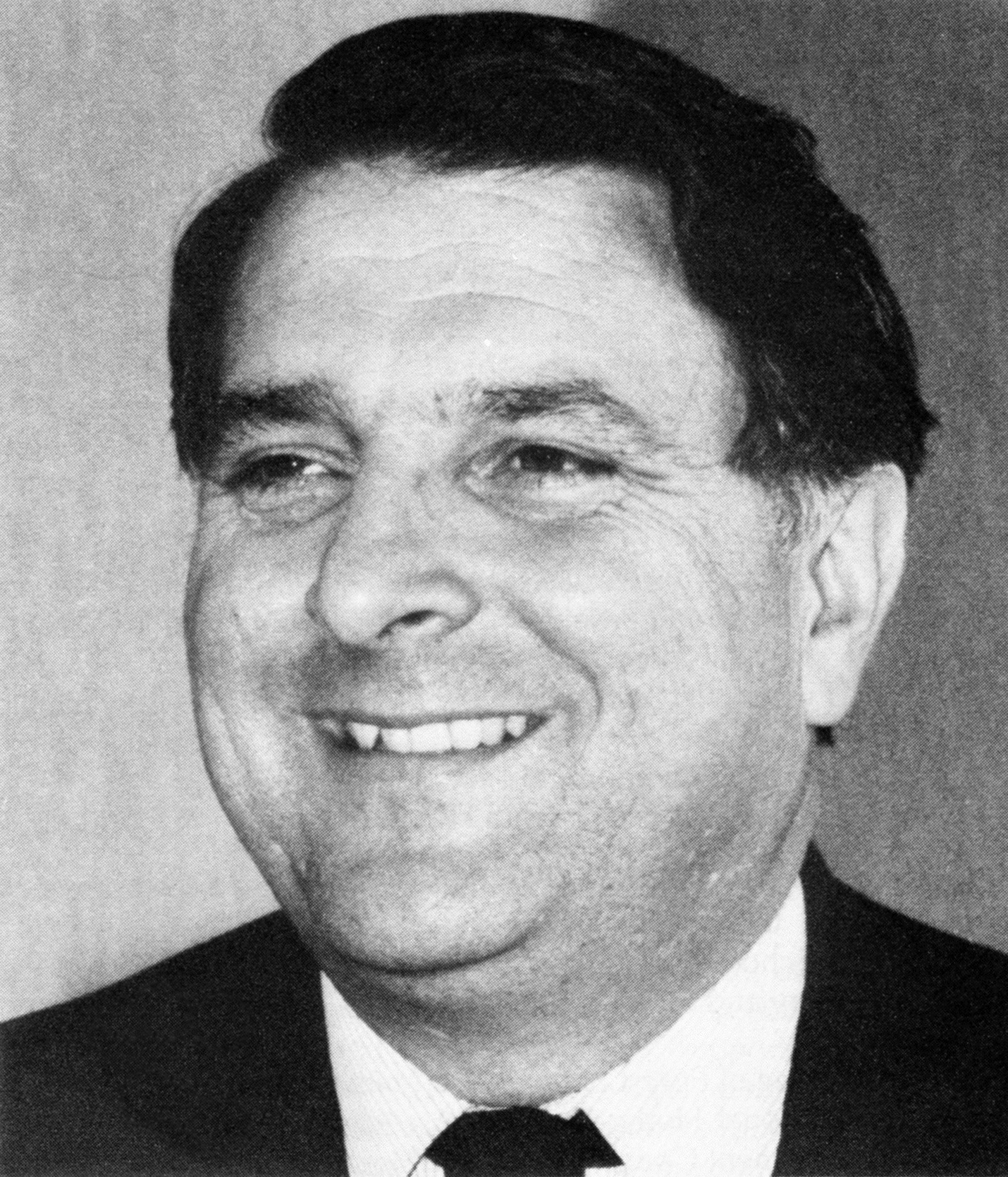
Larry Schmittou won league executive awards in 1978, 1987, and 1989 during his time as team president (1978–1996) and GM (1980–1982 and 1987–1996).

Farrell Owens, a local amateur baseball player and coach, served as the Sounds' first general manager (GM) from 1978 to 1979. Larry Schmittou shared duties with Owens as the team's president, a role in which he served from 1978 to 1996. Schmittou took on additional responsibilities from 1980 to 1982 as general manager. In 1978, 1980, and 1981, the Sounds won the Larry MacPhail Award for outstanding minor league promotions under Owens and Schmittou. The Southern League selected Schmittou as their Executive of the Year in 1978 and inducted him into the Southern League Hall of Fame in 2016.

In February 1983, Schmittou was hired by the Texas Rangers of Major League Baseball as their vice president and director of marketing. He retained his position as Sounds president, but relinquished the GM role to George Dyce, who was previously the team's business manager. Dyce managed the day-to-day operations of the club until Schmittou returned to Nashville after the 1986 season. The American Association selected Schmittou as Executive of the Year in 1987 and 1989. He continued as GM until the sale of the team following the 1996 season.

The new owners utilized the general managers of the Kane County Cougars, a Class A team they also owned, as GMs at Nashville: Bill Larsen from 1997 to 1998 and Jeff Sedivy in 1999. Former Opryland GM Tommy Moncreif was brought in for the 2000 season. In July 2000, dissatisfied with attendance, owner Al Gordon hired former Nashville Kats executive Sharon Burns as vice president for sales, marketing, and communications and made Moncreif vice president of business operations. The two split the duties usually assigned to a general manager. Moncrief was dismissed in May 2001, and his responsibilities were assumed by other staff members. In July 2001, Glenn Yaeger, the chief operating officer of the team's parent company, was named GM. After plans to build a new ballpark to replace the aging Greer Stadium fell through as the city, developers, and team could not come to terms on a plan to finance its construction, Yaeger was dismissed in May 2008 and replaced by Joe Hart, the team's director of sales. Hart remained with the team until its sale to MFP Baseball after the season.

George King, previously the Pacific Coast League's vice president of business and operations, was hired by the new owners to serve as GM from 2009 to 2010. Brad Tammen, the team's former vice president of sales and marketing, guided the organization from 2011 to 2014. Veteran minor league GM Garry Arthur was brought on in 2015 as the team prepared to move into the new First Tennessee Park that season. Arthur retired on April 15, 2016, and co-owner Frank Ward oversaw the duties of GM on an interim basis. Adam Nuse was hired on May 2, 2016, after serving in the same capacity for the Class A Bowling Green Hot Rods for two seasons. Nuse left the Sounds on April 9, 2021, to become the vice president of business operations for the Tennessee Titans. Ward assumed the day-to-day operation of the club while searching for a replacement. Adam English, formerly the general manager of the Triple-A Gwinnett Stripers, was hired as the Sounds' GM on October 1, 2021. Under English, the franchise was recognized with the 2022 Minor League Baseball Organization of the Year Award. English stepped down from the team and was replaced as General Manager in charge of revenue by Danielle Gaw on October 27, 2026. She previously worked for the club from 2014 to 2024. In a corresponding move, Doug Scopel, who has been with the front office since 2000, was elevated to Chief Operating Officer overseeing day-to-day operations.

General managers
| No. | General manager | Season(s) | Ref(s). |
|---|---|---|---|
| 1 | Farrell Owens | 1978–1979 | |
| 2 | Larry Schmittou | 1980–1982 | |
| 3 | George Dyce | 1983–1986 | |
| — | Larry Schmittou | 1987–1996 | |
| 4 | Bill Larsen | 1997–1998 | |
| 5 | Jeff Sedivy | 1999 | |
| 6 | Tommy Moncrief | 2000–2001 | |
| 7 | Sharon Burns | 2000–2001 | |
| 8 | Glenn Yaeger | 2001–2008 | |
| 9 | Joe Hart | 2008 | |
| 10 | George King | 2009–2010 | |
| 11 | Brad Tammen | 2011–2014 | |
| 12 | Garry Arthur | 2015–2016 | |
| 13 | Frank Ward | 2016 | |
| 14 | Adam Nuse | 2016–2020 | |
| — | Frank Ward | 2021 | |
| 15 | Adam English | 2021–2026 | |
| 16 | Danielle Gaw | 2026–present | |
