= 1974 Country Music Association Awards =

Annual US music awards ceremony

- Date: October 14, 1974
- Location: Grand Ole Opry House, Nashville, Tennessee
- Hosted by: Johnny Cash
- Most wins: Charlie Rich (2)
- Most nominations: Charlie Rich; Loretta Lynn; Olivia Newton-John (4 each)

Television/radio coverage
- Network: CBS

The 1974 Country Music Association Awards, 8th Ceremony, was held on October 14, 1974, at the Grand Ole Opry House, Nashville, Tennessee, and was hosted by CMA Award winner Johnny Cash.

== Winners and nominees ==
Winners in Bold.

Entertainer of the Year	Album of the Year
**Charlie Rich**; Roy Clark; Mac Davis; Loretta Lynn; Olivia Newton-John	**Very Special Love Songs — Charlie Rich**; Country Bumpkin — Cal Smith; If We Make It Through December — Merle Haggard; If You Love Me, Let Me Know — Olivia Newton-John; You've Never Been This Far Before — Conway Twitty
Male Vocalist of the Year	Female Vocalist of the Year
**Ronnie Milsap**; Merle Haggard; Waylon Jennings; Charlie Rich; Cal Smith	**Olivia Newton-John**; Loretta Lynn; Anne Murray; Dolly Parton; Tanya Tucker
Vocal Group of the Year	Vocal Duo of the Year
**Statler Brothers**; Brush Arbor; The Buckaroos; The Jordanaires; The Osborne Brothers	**Conway Twitty and Loretta Lynn**; Jack Greene and Jeannie Seely; George Jones and Tammy Wynette; Barbara Mandrell and David Houston; Porter Wagoner and Dolly Parton
Single of the Year	Song of the Year
**"Country Bumpkin" — Cal Smith**; "As Soon As I Hang Up the Phone" — Conway Twitty and Loretta Lynn; "If You Love Me (Let Me Know)" — Olivia Newton-John; "The Most Beautiful Girl" — Charlie Rich; "The Streak" — Ray Stevens	**"Country Bumpkin" — Don Wayne**; "If We Make It Through December" — Merle Haggard; "If You Love Me (Let Me Know)" — John Rostill; "The Most Beautiful Girl" — Norro Wilson, Rory Bourke, Billy Sherrill; "The Streak" — Ray Stevens
Instrumental Group of the Year	Instrumentalist of the Year
**Danny Davis and the Nashville Brass**; Chet Atkins and Merle Travis; The Buckaroos; Po' Boys; The Strangers	**Don Rich**; Chet Atkins; Roy Clark; Lloyd Green; Charlie McCoy

== Hall of Fame ==
Country Music Hall of Fame Inductees
- Owen Bradley
  Pee Wee King
