= 10th Academy of Country Music Awards =

US music awards ceremony in 1975

- Date: March 5, 1975
- Location: Knott's Berry Farm, Buena Park, California
- Hosted by: Loretta Lynn; Roger Miller

Highlights
- Most wins: Loretta Lynn; Cal Smith; (2 each)
- Most nominations: Merle Haggard (5)

Television/radio coverage
- Network: ABC

The 10th Academy of Country Music Awards ceremony was held on March 5, 1975, at Knott's Berry Farm, Buena Park, California. It was hosted by Loretta Lynn and Roger Miller.

== Winners and nominees ==
Winners are shown in bold.

Entertainer of the Year	Album of the Year
**Mac Davis**; Roy Clark; Merle Haggard; Loretta Lynn; Ronnie Milsap	**Back Home Again — John Denver**; Country Bumpkin — Cal Smith; For the Last Time — Bob Wills; Merle Haggard Presents His 30th Album — Merle Haggard; They Don't Make 'Em Like My Daddy — Loretta Lynn
Top Female Vocalist of the Year	Top Male Vocalist of the Year
**Loretta Lynn**; Donna Fargo; Anne Murray; Olivia Newton-John; Dolly Parton	**Merle Haggard**; John Denver; Ronnie Milsap; Cal Smith; Conway Twitty
Single Record of the Year	Song of the Year
**"Country Bumpkin"** — **Cal Smith**; "Back Home Again" — John Denver; "I Can Help" — Billy Swan; "(I'd Be) A Legend in My Time" — Ronnie Milsap; "Things Aren't Funny Anymore" — Merle Haggard	**"Country Bumpkin"** — **Don Wayne**; "Back Home Again" — John Denver; "I Can Help" — Billy Swan; "One Day at a Time" — Kris Kristofferson, Marijohn Wilkin; "Things Aren't Funny Anymore" — Merle Haggard
Most Promising Male Vocalist	Most Promising Female Vocalist
**Mickey Gilley**; Brian Collins; Danny Michaels; Red Stegall; Billy Swan	**Linda Ronstadt**; Kay Austin; Crystal Gayle; La Costa; Sharon Leighton; Marilyn Sellars
Top Vocal Group of the Year
**Conway Twitty** **and** **Loretta Lynn**; Brush Arbor; Dolly Parton and Porter Wagoner; The Rebel Playboys; Statler Brothers
Pioneer Award
**Johnny Bond**; **Merle Travis**; **Tennessee Ernie Ford**
