= Lazy (Irving Berlin song) =

1924 frequently-covered song

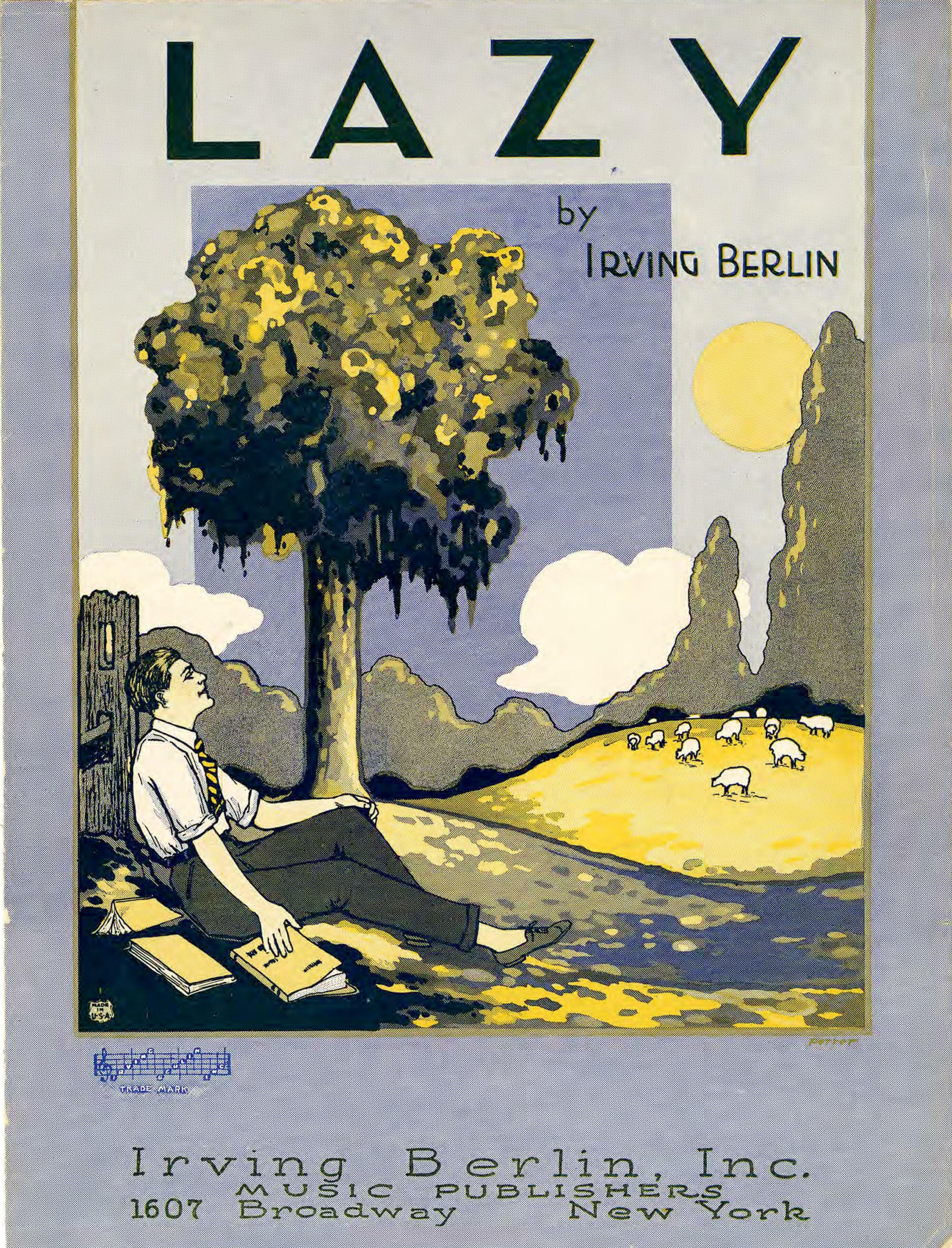
- Sheet music cover

Song by Irving Berlin
- Released: 1924
- Genre: Pop

"Lazy" is a popular song written by Irving Berlin in 1924. Recordings of the song in 1924 were performed by Al Jolson, Blossom Seeley, Paul Whiteman and the Brox Sisters. The best known version may be that performed by Marilyn Monroe, Donald O'Connor, and Mitzi Gaynor in the motion picture There's No Business Like Show Business.

== Other notable recordings ==
- Bing Crosby with Bob Crosby and His Orchestra: Recorded on May 25, 1942. Crosby also sang the song in the film Holiday Inn (1942) in a scene where he is seen being overwhelmed by a plethora of back-breaking tasks at his newly purchased farm while he is heard singing the song offscreen.
- Val Doonican: Included in his album Val Doonican Rocks, But Gently (1967)
- Ella Fitzgerald: Ella Fitzgerald Sings the Irving Berlin Songbook (1958)
- Judy Holliday: Holliday with Mulligan (1980)
- Michael Holliday: Included in his album Happy Holliday (1961)
- Joan Morris and William Bolcom: Blue Skies: Songs by Irving Berlin (1990)
- George Burns: Sang part of the song in the episode of The Lucy Show titled "Lucy and George Burns."
  Full sheet music
- They Might Be Giants: Recorded as a single for WNYC's 2024 Public Song Project, a project encouraging artists to cover public domain songs
