= Billy Parker (singer) =

American singer-songwriter (1937–2026)

Background information
- Born: July 19, 1937; Tuskegee, Creek County, Oklahoma, U.S.
- Died: January 19, 2026 (aged 88) Tulsa, Oklahoma, U.S.
- Genres: Country
- Occupation: Singer
- Instruments: Guitar; vocals
- Years active: 1959–2026
- Labels: SCR; Oak; Soundwaves; Canyon Creek

Billy Parker (July 19, 1937 – January 19, 2026) was an American country music disc jockey and singer. Parker was named Disc Jockey of the Year by the Country Music Association in 1974 and by the Academy of Country Music in 1975, 1977, 1978 and 1984. He was inducted into the Country Music Disc Jockey Hall of Fame in 1992, the Western Swing Hall of Fame in 1993, and received the Oklahoma Association of Broadcasters' Lifetime Achievement Award in 1995.

== Life and career ==
Parker was born in Tuskegee, Creek County, Oklahoma, on July 19, 1937. Between 1976 and 1989, Parker charted more than twenty singles on the Billboard Hot Country Singles & Tracks chart. His highest-charting single, "(Who's Gonna Sing) The Last Country Song," peaked at No. 41 in 1982. He also reached the Top 10 on the RPM Country Tracks chart in Canada with the song "You Are My Angel" in 1988.

== Death ==
Parker died at a hospital in Tulsa, Oklahoma on January 19, 2026, aged 88.

== Discography ==
=== Albums ===
Year	Album	Label
1965	If I Make It Through The Night	Pride
1967	From Me To You	Luck
1976	Average Man	Sunshine
1977	Billy Parker	Sunshine Country
1982	(Who's Gonna Sing) The Last Country Song	Soundwaves
1983	Something Old Something New	Soundwaves
1988	Always Country	Canyon Creek
1991	I'll Speak Out For You, Jesus	Canyon Creek
1996	Swingin' With Bob	Sim

=== Singles ===
Year	Single	Chart Positions		Album
Year	Single	US Country	CAN Country	Album
1976	"It's Bad When You're Caught (With the Goods)"	79	—	Average Man
1977	"Lord, If I Make It to Heaven Can I Bring My Own Angel Along"	71	—	singles only
1977	"What Did I Promise Her Last Night"	75	—	singles only
1977	"If You Got to Have It Your Way (I'll Go Mine)"	94	—	singles only
1978	"You Read Between the Lines"	62	—	singles only
1978	"If There's One Angel Missing (She's Here in My Arms Tonight)"	81	—	singles only
1978	"Until the Next Time"	50	—	singles only
1978	"Pleasin' My Woman"	73	—	singles only
1979	"Thanks E.T. Thanks a Lot"	98	—	singles only
1979	"Thanks a Lot"	80	—	singles only
1979	"Tough Act to Follow"	82	—	singles only
1981	"Better Side of Thirty"	74	—	singles only
1981	"I'll Drink to That"	53	—	singles only
1982	"I See an Angel Every Day"	51	—	singles only
1982	"(Who's Gonna Sing) The Last Country Song"	41	—	singles only
1982	"If I Ever Need a Lady" (with Cal Smith)	53	—	singles only
1982	"Too Many Irons in the Fire" (with Cal Smith)	68	—	singles only
1983	"Who Said Love Was Fair"	68	—	singles only
1983	"Love Don't Know a Lady (From a Honky Tonk Girl)"	59	—	singles only
1987	"You Don't Have to Drive Me Crazy"	—	55	singles only
1988	"You Are My Angel"	72	10	Always Country
1988	"She's Sittin' Pretty"	81	9	Always Country
1989	"It's Fine for Your Dreams to Come True"	87	50	Always Country
