= Larry Schmittou =

American baseball executive and coach

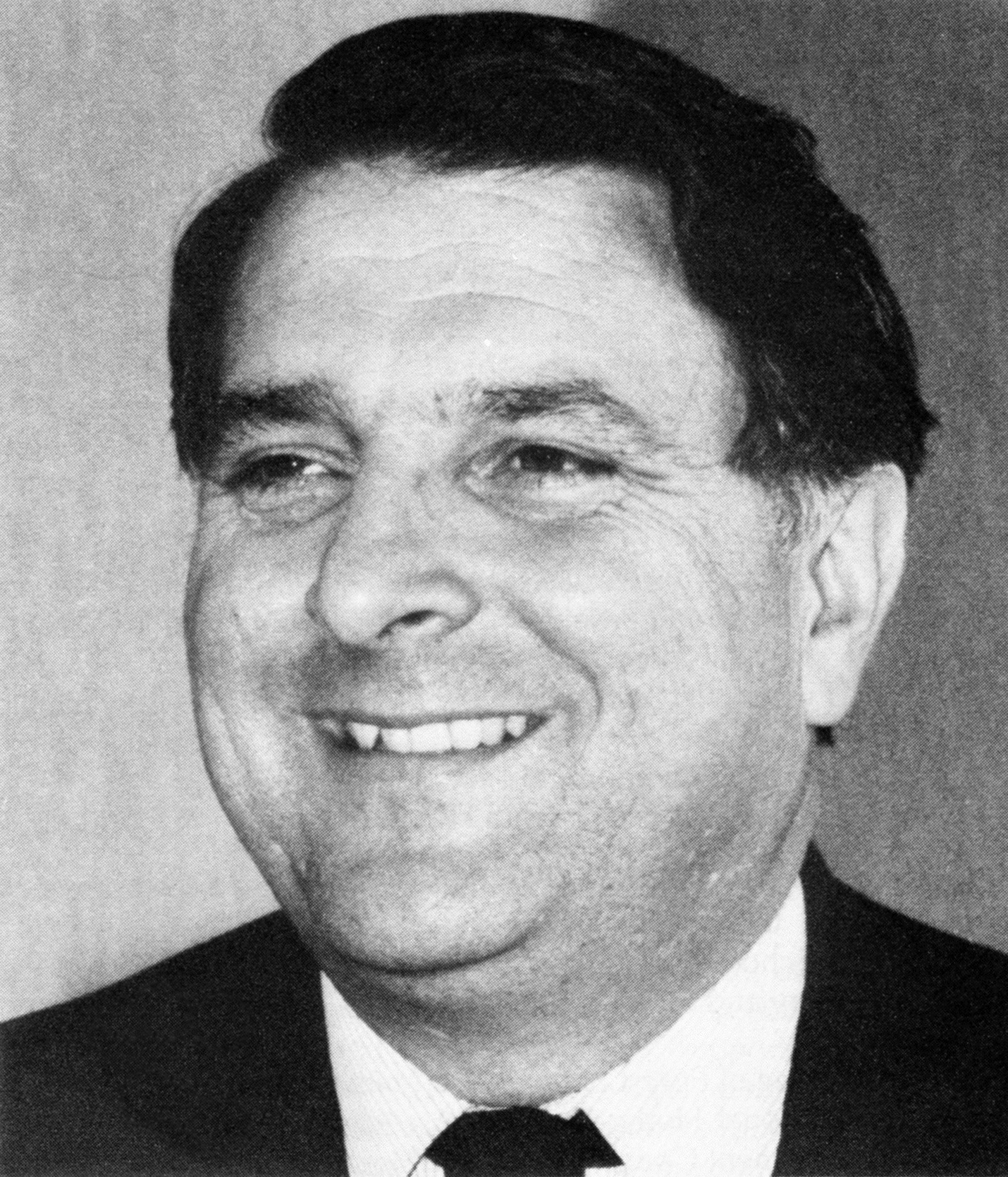
- Schmittou in 1984
- Born: July 19, 1940 (age 86); Nashville, Tennessee, U.S.
- Education: Peabody College
- Occupations: Educator; Entrepreneur; Vanderbilt Commodores baseball coach Minor League Baseball owner/executive Vice President of Marketing for the Texas Rangers (MLB)
- Spouse: Shirley (1959–present)

Larry Schmittou (born July 19, 1940) is an American entrepreneur and former baseball executive and coach. He owns L&S Family Entertainment LLC, which operates a chain of bowling centers in Tennessee, Kentucky, Ohio, and Indiana.

From 1968 to 1978, Schmittou was the head coach of Vanderbilt University's baseball team, the Vanderbilt Commodores. From 1978 to 1996, he owned shares in several Minor League Baseball teams, beginning with the Nashville Sounds. He also owned shares in the Daytona Beach Islanders, Eugene Emeralds, Greensboro Hornets, Huntsville Stars, Salem Redbirds, Salt Lake City Gulls, Wichita Pilots/Wranglers, and Winston-Salem Spirits baseball teams as well as a minor league hockey team and minor league basketball team.

While president of the Sounds, Nashville led all of Minor League Baseball in attendance in their first season and went on to lead the Southern League in attendance in each of their seven seasons as members of the league. The franchise was recognized for its promotion efforts when it won the Larry MacPhail Award for outstanding minor league promotions in 1978, 1980, and 1981. Schmittou was later hired to serve as the Vice President of Marketing for the Texas Rangers Major League Baseball (MLB) team from 1983 to 1986. He also headed a group that sought, unsuccessfully, to place a major league franchise in Nashville as part of the 1993 MLB expansion.

Schmittou was chosen for the Southern League Executive of the Year Award in 1978 and was inducted into the Southern League Hall of Fame in 2016. He won the American Association Executive of the Year Award in 1987 and 1989. In 2006, Schmittou was inducted into the Tennessee Sports Hall of Fame. He was awarded the Fred Russell Lifetime Achievement Award by the Nashville Sports Council in 2011.

== Early life ==
Larry Schmittou was born on July 19, 1940, in Nashville, Tennessee, to parents Egbert and Jane Ann. He was named for Larry Gilbert, manager of the Nashville Vols Minor League Baseball team from 1939 to 1948. Schmittou was the youngest of five children.

When he was a junior in high school, Schmittou began coaching youth baseball teams for 9 to 12-year-old children. Concurrently, he pitched on the Cohn High School baseball team. After graduating, he enrolled at Peabody College, which is known for its teacher education program. He continued to coach three youth baseball teams and play in a city league while attending Peabody. By the end of his sandlot coaching career, Schmittou had over 500 wins, 20 city championships, 8 state championships, and 6 of his teams went to national tournaments.

Schmittou taught in the Nashville public school system from 1961 to 1968. He was originally hired and assigned to teach at Haywood Elementary, but not wanting to teach at an elementary school without athletic programs, Schmittou instead accepted an offer to become the head coach of the football, basketball, and track teams at Bailey Junior High. He remained at Bailey for three years before being hired as the head basketball coach at Goodlettsville High School. Two-and-a-half years later, Schmittou left high school coaching for good. During this time, he had also worked for several years as a territorial scout for the Cleveland Indians Major League Baseball team.

== Vanderbilt Commodores ==
In 1968, Schmittou became the head baseball coach and head football recruiter at Vanderbilt University in Nashville. From 1971 to 1974, he led the Vanderbilt Commodores baseball team to win four consecutive Southeastern Conference (SEC) East Division titles. In 1973 and 1974, the teams also won the SEC championship, and Schmittou earned the SEC Baseball Coach of the Year Award. Through 11 years of coaching (1968–1978), Schmittou led his teams to a 306–252–1 (.548) overall record and a 98–98 (.500) SEC record.

== Minor League Baseball ==
=== Nashville Sounds ===
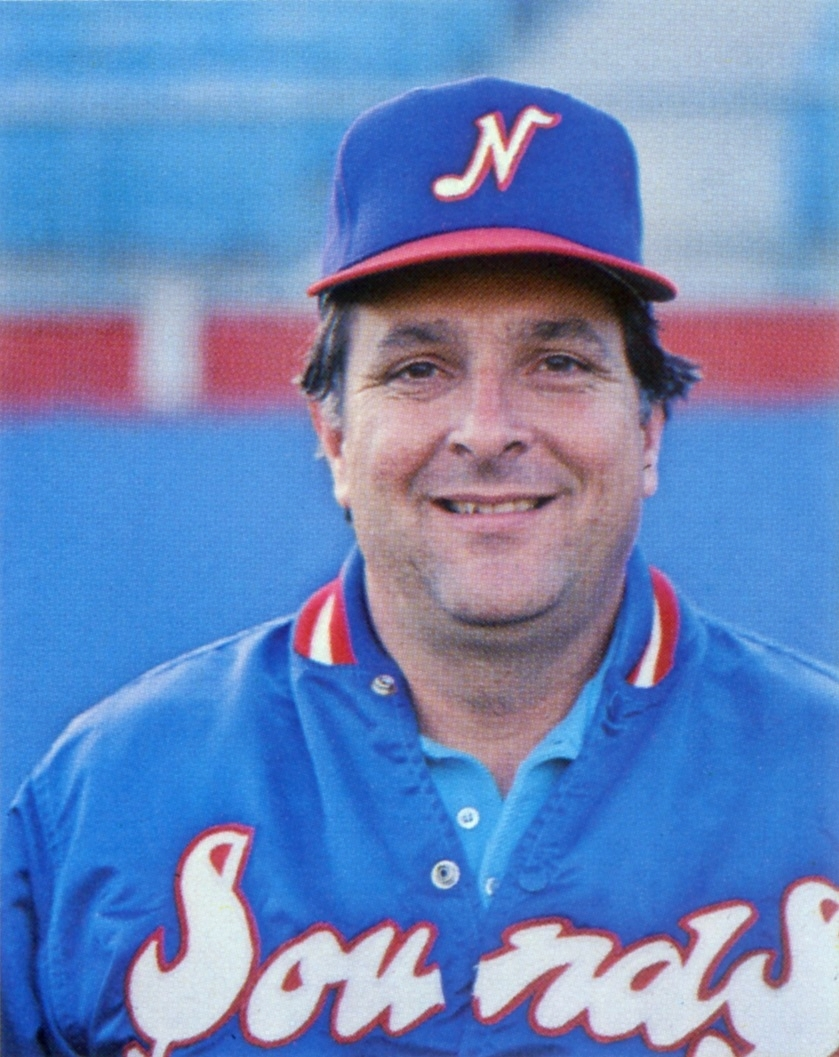
Schmittou with the Nashville Sounds in 1979

Larry Schmittou was inspired to get involved with Minor League Baseball when he observed the large crowds the Chattanooga Lookouts saw after owner Walter Reed acquired the Birmingham Barons and relocated the team to Chattanooga in 1976. Schmittou was told by multiple Major League Baseball teams that they would be willing to put a minor league affiliate in Nashville if he provided a suitable ballpark.

He learned from a member of the Metro Board of Parks and Recreation that neither the Parks Board or the city of Nashville would be willing to pay for such a park. So, Schmittou, along with help from country musician Conway Twitty, put together a group of investors including other country artists Cal Smith and Jerry Reed, as well as other Nashvillians, to finance a stadium and a minor league team. Twenty shares valued at US$15,000 each were issued; Schmittou purchased 2 shares, or 10 percent of the team, and Twitty purchased 4 shares for a 20 percent stake. The Metro Parks Board agreed to lease to Schmittou the site of Nashville's former softball fields on the grounds of Fort Negley, an American Civil War fortification, approximately two miles (3.2 km) south of downtown, for a period of 20 years as long as he built a stadium with a minimum capacity of 6,500 at a cost of at least $400,000 within 10 years. In the second ten years, he would be required to pay the city seven percent of the team's total revenue.

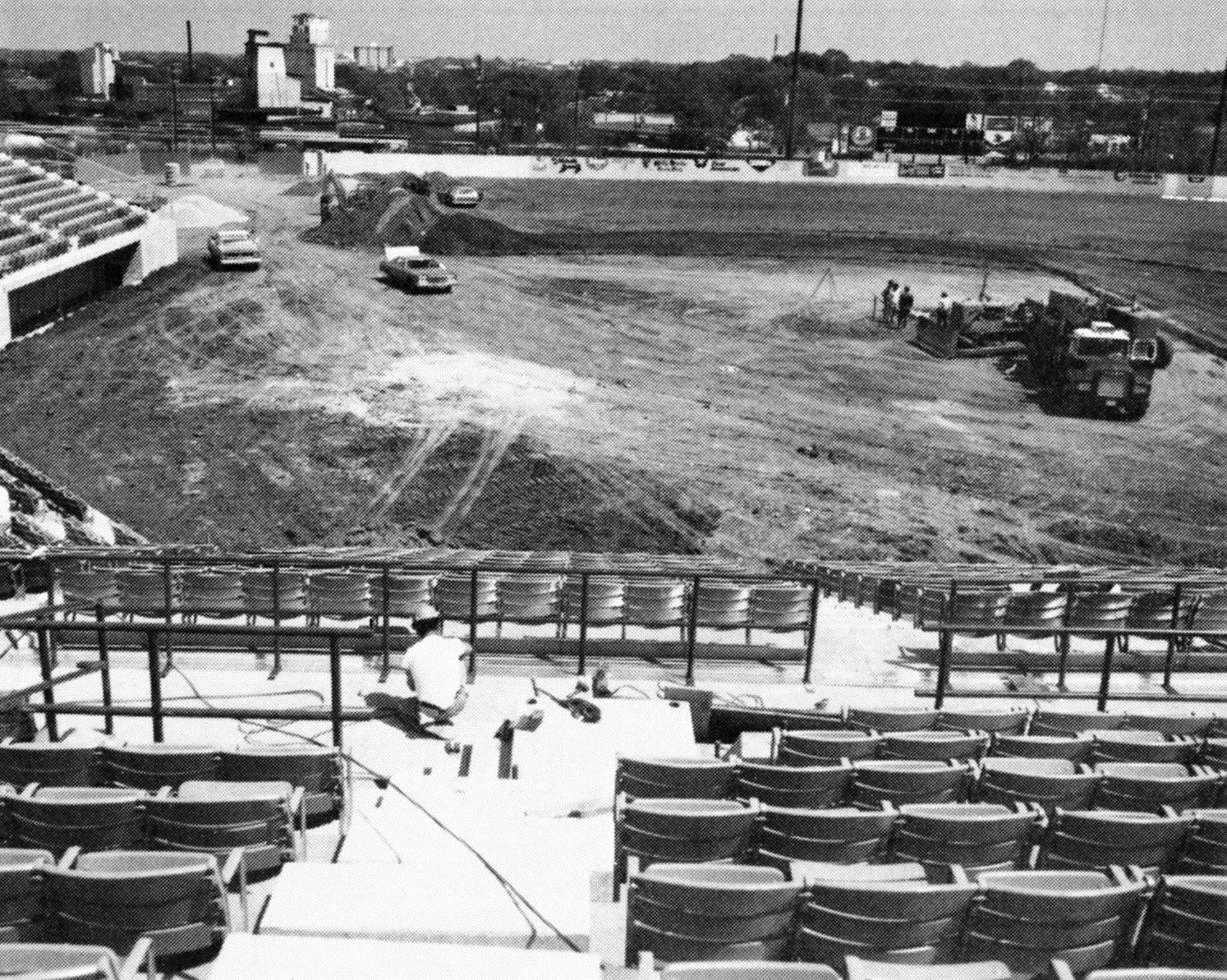
Herschel Greer Stadium, home ballpark of the Nashville Sounds from 1978 to 2014, in the final stages of construction

Stoll-Reed Architects advised Schmittou that construction of a suitable stadium would cost between $300,000 and $500,000, but bids for the project ranged from $980,000 to $1.2 million. Schmittou looked to local suppliers to donate construction materials, took out a $30,000 loan from a bank, sold season tickets in advance of having a team, and even mortgaged his own home to help pay for the facility. The actual cost totaled $1.5 million. The ballpark would be named Herschel Greer Stadium in posthumous honor of Herschel Lynn Greer, a prominent Nashville businessman and the first president of the Nashville Vols, whose family donated $25,000 for stadium construction.

Having secured a stadium, Schmittou and general manager Farrell Owens attended the 1976 Winter Meetings in hopes of landing a major league affiliate. After sending letters to all 26 farm team directors, the pair received a letter from Sheldon "Chief" Bender of the Cincinnati Reds. Bender met with the pair and agreed to put a team in Nashville provided a stadium was built. Schmittou was then granted a franchise in the Southern League, a class Double-A league, at an enfranchisement cost of $7,500.

He called the expansion team the Nashville Sounds, a play on the term "Nashville sound", a subgenre of American country music that traces its roots to the area in the late-1950s. Nashville's original logo, which was used from 1978 into 1998, and was initially sketched by Schmittou, reflected the city's association with the country music industry. It depicted a mustachioed baseball player, nicknamed "Slugger", swinging at a baseball with an acoustic guitar, a staple of country music, in place of a bat. Further illustrating the city's musical ties was the typeface, with letters that resembled G-clefs, used to display the team name and the cap logo which resembled an eighth note.

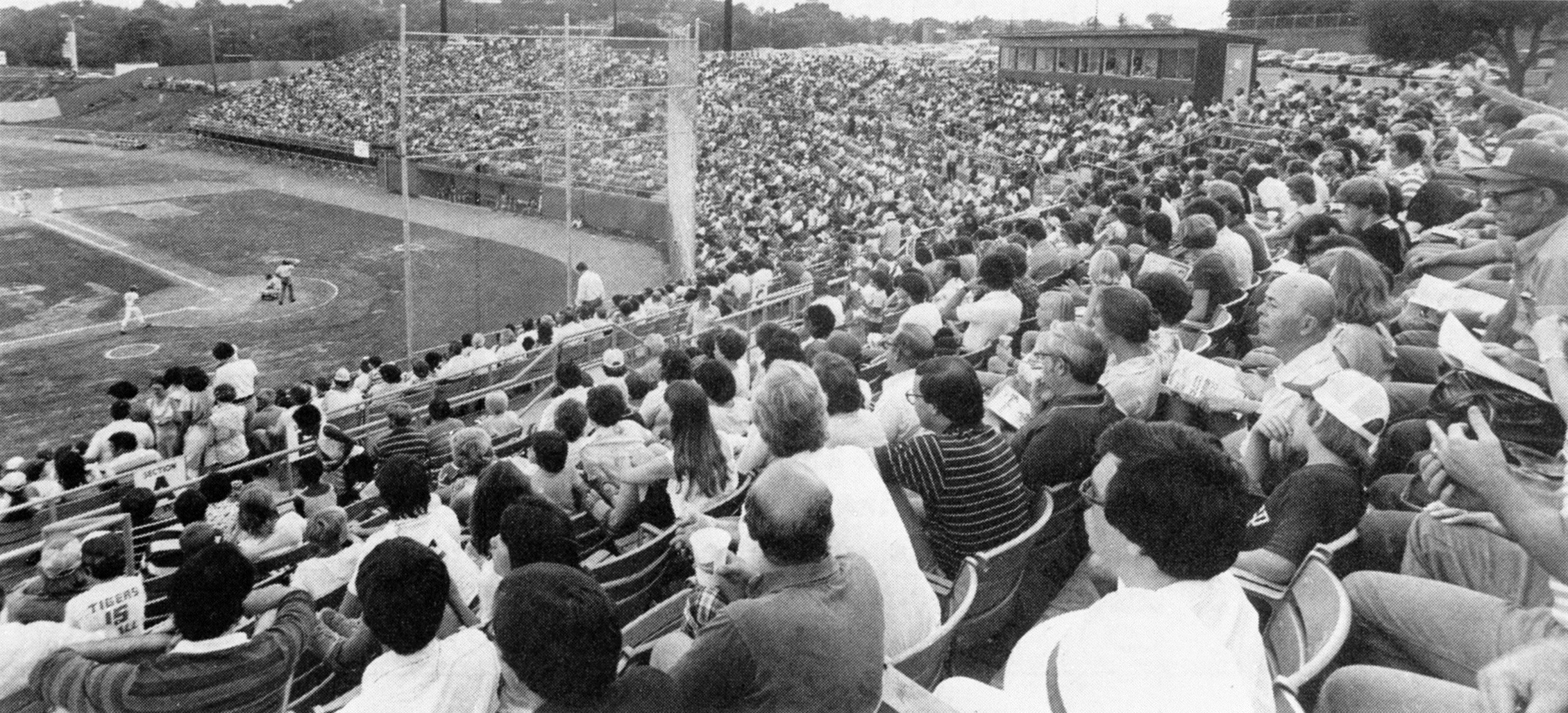
Nashville lead the Southern League in attendance in each of their seven seasons as members (1978–1984).

The Sounds led all of Minor League Baseball in attendance by drawing 380,000 fans to Greer Stadium in their first season. Nashville went on to lead the Southern League in attendance in each of their seven seasons as members of the league. Schmittou's business philosophy revolved around earning profits not from ticket sales, but from the sale of souvenirs and concessions. This philosophy also involved promoting family-friendly entertainment rather than baseball games. Through the mid-1980s, the Sounds offered nightly promotions and treated fans to a carnival-like atmosphere between innings. Schmittou and his team developed a promotional calendar that regularly featured giveaways ranging from T-shirts and trading cards to youth baseball equipment and even a player's used 1969 Buick Electra. Other promotions varied from discount ticket nights and buyout nights, where local businesses gave away tickets, to the more unusual "Tight Fittin' Jeans" Contest in which the woman wearing the tightest jeans would win a pair. The franchise was recognized for its promotion efforts when it won the Larry MacPhail Award for outstanding minor league promotions in 1978, 1980, and 1981. Schmittou was chosen for the Southern League Executive of the Year Award and Sporting News Double-A Executive of the Year Award in 1978. The Southern League inducted Schmittou into their Hall of Fame in 2016.

In 1983, Schmittou noticed a 5 percent drop in season ticket sales, a higher ratio of no-shows from season ticket holders, and a slight decline in overall attendance. These issues with spectator turnout were accompanied by a decline in local media coverage, particularly in regard to road games. To boost interest in the team, Schmittou tried to purchase a Triple-A franchise late in the 1983 season, but each of the two teams he considered chose to continue in their markets for 1984. His desire to land a Triple-A team was part of a larger plan to put Nashville in a position to contend for a Major League Baseball franchise in the future.

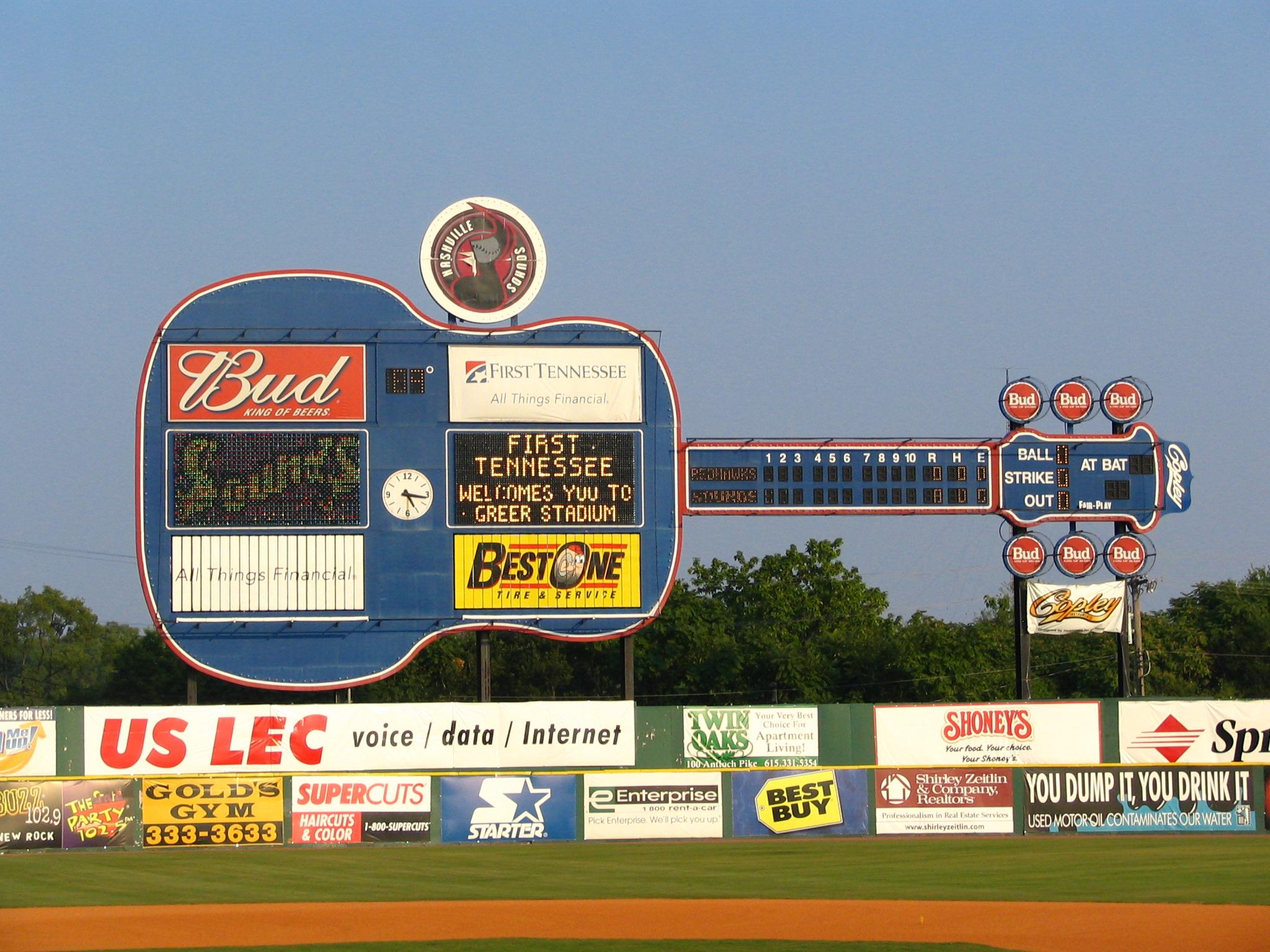
Herschel Greer Stadium's iconic guitar-shaped scoreboard, installed in 1993

Schmittou arrived at terms in July 1984 to purchase the Triple-A Evansville Triplets of the American Association for a reported sum of $780,000, with plans to move the franchise from Evansville, Indiana, to Nashville for the 1985 season. To prove to the team's Nashville banks, which would back the purchase, that the move was financially viable, Schmittou commissioned a survey to evaluate the potential turnout for a Triple-A team versus a Double-A team. Though the research proved to team owners that the move was a sensible decision, the banks were not impressed. As a result, the team switched banks and went ahead with the purchase and relocation. The Southern League wanted Schmittou to surrender his franchise to the league, but he had plans to relocate the team instead. He wanted to send Nashville's existing Southern League franchise to Evansville to continue as the Triplets at Double-A. However, a combination of the league's disapproval of the move and the City of Evansville being unwilling to upgrade Bosse Field resulted in a move to Huntsville, Alabama, where the team became the Huntsville Stars. The Triple-A Sounds carried on the history of the Double-A team that preceded it. The Triplets' legacy was retired, and the Stars were established as an entirely new franchise.

As president of the Triple-A Sounds, Schmittou was selected as the American Association's Executive of the Year in 1987 and 1989, as well as the Sporting News Triple-A Executive of the Year in 1989. The 1996 season marked the last that Schmittou was the team's president and part owner. With the city prepared to welcome a National Football League franchise, the Tennessee Titans, Schmittou felt that revenue would be drawn away from his baseball team, so he and businessman Walter Nipper sold their 59 percent stake in the Sounds to Chicago-based businessmen Al Gordon, Mike Murtaugh, and Mike Woleben for an estimated $4 million.

=== Other teams ===
From 1993 to 1994, Schmittou operated a second minor league team, called the Nashville Xpress, at Greer Stadium. In conjunction with the 1993 Major League Baseball expansion, the Double-A Charlotte Knights of the Southern League were selected to move up to Triple-A as an International League franchise. This left the Southern League team without a home. Southern League president Jimmy Bragen approached Schmittou about placing the team at Ernie Shore Field in Winston-Salem, North Carolina, home of Schmittou's Class A-Advanced Winston-Salem Spirits of the Carolina League. The facility would have been inadequate for a Double-A team, so Schmittou offered Greer as a temporary home for the team. A one-year management arrangement was decided upon wherein Schmittou and the Sounds' staff would be responsible for taking care of the Southern League team. This marked the first time that two minor league teams would operate in the same city since 1972, when the Charlotte Hornets and Charlotte Twins shared Calvin Griffith Park. By the end of the season, a deal was reached to relocate the Xpress to Lexington, Kentucky, but the team owner was unable to get a new ballpark built in that city. Schmittou agreed to keep the team in Nashville for one more year. After the failed attempt to relocate the team to Lexington, and even Bayamón, Puerto Rico, the Xpress left for Wilmington, North Carolina, after the 1994 season, becoming the Port City Roosters in 1995.

In addition to the Nashville Sounds, Huntsville Stars, and Winston-Salem Spirits, Schmittou also owned the Daytona Beach Islanders, Eugene Emeralds, Greensboro Hornets, Salem Redbirds, Salt Lake City Gulls, and Wichita Pilots/Wranglers. By the end of 1996, Schmittou had sold all of his baseball teams and retired from the professional baseball business.

== Major League Baseball ==
From 1983 to 1986, Schmittou served as the Vice President of Marketing for the Texas Rangers Major League Baseball (MLB) club.

In November 1985, Schmittou headed a delegation from Nashville that was one of 12 groups to make presentations to MLB owners and commissioner Peter Ueberroth regarding the viability of expansion in their cities. The delegation was encouraged with their reception but were concerned that people may not know Nashville well enough to make it a strong contender. The Governor's Commission on Major League Baseball entrusted Schmittou and other Sounds owners with ownership of a potential franchise and responsibility for the financial requirement set forth by the expansion committee. Schmittou launched a drive to pre-sell 10,000 season tickets, which was met and exceeded.

In June 1990, MLB announced its intentions to add two new National League teams in a 1993 expansion. Joining Nashville in competition for these two spots were Buffalo, New York; Charlotte, North Carolina; Denver, Colorado; Miami, Florida; Orlando, Florida; Phoenix, Arizona; Sacramento, California; St. Petersburg, Florida; Tampa, Florida; Vancouver, British Columbia; and Washington, D.C. Schmittou gave a formal presentation to the National League Expansion Committee in September 1990. His plan for MLB in Nashville included a proposed $40-million ballpark to be built at the convergence of Interstate 24 and Briley Parkway that would have included a 150-foot (46 m) scoreboard shaped like the neck of a guitar and seated 40,000 people. Along with the submission of a 120-page proposal, the committee was shown a video narrated by Country Music Hall of Fame member Eddy Arnold, which extolled the suitability of a Nashville for a major league team. On December 18, the committee released a short list of six finalist candidates—Nashville was not included on the list. The two new franchises were eventually awarded to Denver (the Colorado Rockies) and Miami (the Florida Marlins).

== Hockey ==
In 1981, Schmittou led a group that brought minor league ice hockey back to Nashville at Municipal Auditorium. The Nashville South Stars played the 1981–82 season in the Central Hockey League, and the 1982–83 season in Atlantic Coast Hockey League. In both seasons, the South Stars served as an affiliate of the National Hockey League's Minnesota North Stars. Schmittou's group sold the team after their second season, and the South Stars were relocated to Vinton, Virginia, as the Virginia Lancers.

== Basketball ==
Schmittou purchased a basketball franchise in the newly-formed Global Basketball Association in 1990. The Music City Jammers played a Municipal Auditorium in the 1991–92 season. Low attendance resulted in relocating the team to Jackson, Tennessee, at Oman Arena, for the 1992–93 season. The league collapsed during the second season, as did the team.

== Strike & Spare Family Entertainment LLC ==
Schmittou formed Strike & Spare Family Entertainment LLC, which operates a chain of 16 bowling centers in Tennessee, Kentucky, Ohio, and Indiana, in August 2000.
