= Val Doonican Rocks, But Gently =

Studio album by Val Doonican
- Released: November 1967
- Recorded: 1967
- Genre: Easy listening
- Length: 39:00
- Label: Pye NPL.18204
- Producer: Val Doonican

Val Doonican chronology
Gentle Shades of Val Doonican	Val Doonican Rocks, But Gently	Val

Val Doonican Rocks, But Gently was the only number one in the UK Albums Chart for the Irish singer, Val Doonican. It spent three weeks at the top of that chart between 31 December 1967 and 20 January 1968, displacing The Beatles album Sgt. Pepper's Lonely Hearts Club Band which had been in that spot for many weeks. The idea for the album came from the popular closing sequence of Doonican's TV show, in which he sang a song while seated in a rocking chair. It is one of the very few Number 1 albums never to have had an official CD release.

There was a problem with the distribution of the album in Ireland as Pye failed to get the quantities required of the LP as precautions at Dublin Airport due to a foot-and-mouth outbreak in Britain resulted in a backlog of records to be disinfected and BEA and Aer Lingus refused to accept further supplies.

== Track listing ==
Side one
No.	Title	Writer(s)	Length
1.	"Scarlet Ribbons"	Evelyn Danzig, Jack Segal	3:32
2.	"If I Were a Carpenter"	Tim Hardin	2:20
3.	"Rainin'"	Bobby Darin	4:02
4.	"Hold Me"	Jack Little / Dave Oppenheim / Ira Schuster	2:28
5.	"Yesterday"	John Lennon, Paul McCartney	2:34
6.	"Small World"	Jule Styne, Stephen Sondheim	3:26
7.	"He'll Have to Go"	Joe Allison, Audrey Allison	2:52

Side two
No.	Title	Writer(s)	Length
1.	"A Man Chases a Girl"	Irving Berlin	3:09
2.	"Visions"	Paul Ferris	2:53
3.	"Bella Rosa"	Irving Burgie	2:53
4.	"Lazy"	Irving Berlin	2:25
5.	"My Colouring Book"	John Kander, Fred Ebb	3:06
6.	"The Folks Who Live on the Hill"	Jerome Kern, Oscar Hammerstein II	2:49
7.	"Take Me"	Leon Payne, George Jones	2:49
