= Yvonne Littlewood =

British television director and producer (1927–2023)

Yvonne Littlewood MBE
- Born: 22 July 1927; Maidstone, Kent, England
- Died: 7 July 2023 (aged 95); London, England
- Occupations: Television producer and director

Yvonne Mary Pearl Littlewood MBE (22 July 1927 – 7 July 2023) was a British television director and producer.

== Early life ==
Born in Maidstone, Kent, her career extended over five decades. As a child, she briefly moved to King's Lynn, Norfolk, before going to Ross-on-Wye, Herefordshire, where she was schooled. Her father was a bank accountant in the town, and both her parents were members of the Ross Operatic and Dramatic Society. She was sent for dancing lessons at May Hatton's Academy in Hereford, and took her exams at The Royal Academy.

== Career ==
Littlewood began to work for the BBC in 1944 as a typist in Portland Place, rising to business secretary, and then took a pay cut to work as a production secretary for a producer around the age of 20 at Alexandra Palace, then the base of BBC Television, intending to become one herself. She was later the first female producer in BBC light entertainment, in 1963 she directed the Eurovision Song Contest, which was broadcast live from BBC Television Centre in London. Around the same time she was involved in starting the Jazz 625 series for BBC 2, although she was not the series regular producer.

Littlewood is best known for producing and directing light entertainment shows for the BBC. These include series featuring Petula Clark and Nana Mouskouri, and specials, such as 'Only Olivia' starring Olivia Newton-John; but her longest association was with The Val Doonican Music Show.

== Death ==
Littlewood died in London on 7 July 2023, at the age of 95.
