= Walk Tall (country song) =

Song by Val Doonican
- Released: 1964
- Genre: Country music
- Songwriter: Don Wayne

"Walk Tall" is a country music song written by American songwriter Don Wayne. It was a number 3 hit on the UK singles chart in 1964 for Irish singer Val Doonican, becoming Doonican's first British chart success. Doonican's version also reached no.2 in Ireland and no.29 in Australia. On the New Zealand Lever Hit Parade charts it peaked at #4. In the US, the song was recorded by Faron Young, whose version reached no.10 on the country music chart in late 1965.

The Val Doonican version was used in the 1965 episode of the Irish television show Reeling in the Years.
