= Don Wayne (songwriter) =

American songwriter

- Born: May 30, 1933; Nashville, Tennessee, United States
- Died: September 12, 2011 (aged 78); United States
- Genres: Country music
- Occupation: Songwriter

Donald William Choate (May 30, 1933 – September 12, 2011), who wrote and recorded as Don Wayne, was an American country music songwriter.

Don Choate was born in Nashville, Tennessee, and attended William James High School in White Bluff. He left school early and worked as a tool and diemaker, with aspirations to become a professional musician and songwriter. One of his first successes as a songwriter was "The Lonesome Waltz", co-written with Vic McAlpin and recorded by George Morgan in 1953. In 1958 Wayne recorded "Head Over Heels In Love" for the Swan label, followed the next year by "Poor Little Jimmy" for Look Records, which, though not a hit, was later recorded by both Hank Snow and Burl Ives.

His biggest successes as a songwriter included "Walk Tall", recorded by Faron Young and a big UK hit for Irish singer Val Doonican in 1964; "Saginaw, Michigan", recorded by Lefty Frizzell; "Belles of Southern Bell", a hit for Del Reeves; "If Teardrops Were Silver", recorded by Jean Shepard; and, his biggest hit, "Country Bumpkin", a #1 hit on the country chart in 1974 for Cal Smith. Smith also had hits with several more Wayne songs including “It's Time to Pay the Fiddler”, “She Talked A Lot About Texas”, and “Woman, Don’t Try To Sing My Song.” Other musicians who recorded his songs included Jim Reeves, Loretta Lynn, Conway Twitty, and Hank Williams, Jr.

Wayne won three BMI Awards and an ASCAP Performance Award, and was inducted into the Nashville Songwriters Association International Hall of Fame in 1978.

He died in 2011, aged 78, from brain cancer.
