= It's Time to Pay the Fiddler =

Single by Cal Smith

from the album It's Time to Pay the Fiddler
- B-side: "Love is the Foundation"
- Released: November 1974
- Recorded: June 6, 1974
- Studio: Bradley's Barn, Mount Juliet, Tennessee
- Genre: Country
- Length: 3:36
- Label: MCA Records 40335
- Songwriter(s): Don Wayne and Walter Haynes
- Producer(s): Walter Haynes

Cal Smith singles chronology
"Between Lust and Watching TV" (1974)	"It's Time to Pay the Fiddler" (1974)	"She Talked a Lot About Texas" (1975)

""It's Time to Pay the Fiddler" is a song written by Don Wayne and Walter Haynes, and performed by American country music artist Cal Smith. It was released in November 1974 as the first single and title track from the album It's Time to Pay the Fiddler. The song was Smith's third and final number one on the country chart. The single stayed at number one for a single week and spent a total of twelve weeks on the country chart.

== Chart performance ==
=== Weekly charts ===
Chart (1974–1975)	Peak position
US Hot Country Songs (Billboard)	1
Canadian RPM Country Tracks	1

=== Year-end charts ===
Chart (1975)	Position
US Hot Country Songs (Billboard)	7
