= The Lord Knows I'm Drinking =

Single by Cal Smith

from the album I've Found Someone of My Own
- B-side: "Sweet Things I Remember About You"
- Released: November 1972
- Recorded: March 12, 1972
- Studio: Bradley's Barn, Mount Juliet, Tennessee
- Genre: Country
- Length: 2:48
- Label: Decca Records 33040
- Songwriter: Bill Anderson
- Producer: Walter Haynes

Cal Smith singles chronology
"For My Baby" (1972)	"The Lord Knows I'm Drinking" (1972)	"I Can Feel the Leaving Coming On" (1973)

"The Lord Knows I'm Drinking" is a song written by Bill Anderson, and recorded by American country music singer Cal Smith. It was released in November 1972 as the third single from the album I've Found Someone of My Own.

== Song background ==
Smith, who had first gained fame performing with Ernest Tubb's Texas Troubadours in the 1960s, released a series of minor hits in the late 1960s and early 1970s. In 1972, he hit the top five of the Billboard Hot Country Singles chart with "I've Found Someone of My Own" (a cover of The Free Movement pop hit). Later in 1972, he released what became his first number-one hit, the Anderson-penned "The Lord Knows I'm Drinking."

A sharp denunciation of small-town religious self-righteousness, "The Lord Knows I'm Drinking" was his first number-one country hit in March, as part of a 15-week stay on in the Billboard country chart's top 40. The record was also Smith's only single to cross over to the pop chart, where it peaked at number 64.

"The Lord Knows I'm Drinking" was one of the last country music hits for the original Decca Records; in early 1973, the label was dropped in favor of MCA Records, where Smith continued recording and enjoying success.

== Chart performance ==
Chart (1972–1973)	Peak position
US Hot Country Songs (Billboard)	1
US Billboard Hot 100	64
Canadian RPM Country Tracks	1
