= Southern League Hall of Fame =

Professional sports hall of fame

- Established: 2013
- Dissolved: 2021
- Type: Professional sports hall of fame

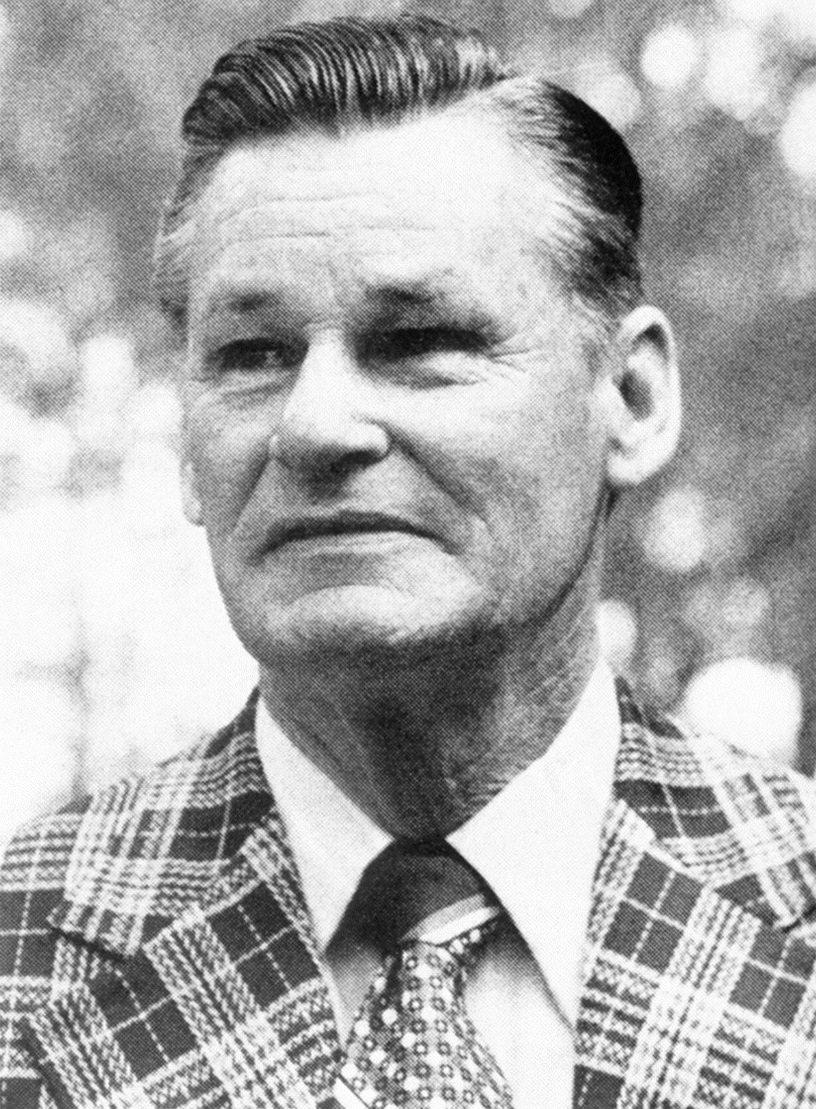
Billy Hitchcock, president of the Southern League from 1971 to 1980, was part of the first class of inductees in 2014.

The Southern League Hall of Fame was an American baseball hall of fame which honored players, managers, coaches, umpires, owners, executives, and media personnel of the Southern League of Minor League Baseball for their accomplishments and/or contributions to the league and its teams. The Hall of Fame inducted its first class in 2014 and its last in 2020. A total of 45 people were inducted. It had no physical location, but plaques listing each year's inductees were placed in the league's office in Marietta, Georgia.

In July 2013, the Southern League Board of Directors met to determine the first members of the league's Hall of Fame class. They were to be inducted in 2014 in conjunction with the celebration of the 50th anniversary of the league's foundation in 1964. Former league presidents Billy Hitchcock, Jim Bragan, and Don Mincher were unanimously selected. They and ten others, one chosen by each of the league's ten teams, were recognized as the inaugural Hall of Fame class at the 2014 Southern League All-Star Game in Chattanooga, Tennessee.

Nomination and election methods varied in succeeding years. For the 2015 class, each team nominated up to three individuals for consideration. A 31-person voting committee of Southern League and Minor League Baseball personnel then narrowed the list to ten inductees, selecting one from each organization for induction. A tie vote for the Birmingham Barons' nominees resulted in the election of both Rollie Fingers and Frank Thomas. A Special Consideration Ballot was introduced that year, which allowed teams to nominate anyone who had made significant contributions to teams from the league's predecessors: the original Southern League (1885–1899) and Southern Association (1901–1961). Harmon Killebrew became the first inductee to be elected via the Special Consideration Ballot in 2015. A similar format was assumed in 2016, wherein each team and members of the voting committee submitted nominations but only the top three were chosen for induction by a 30-member voting committee. The size of the voting panel fluctuated from year to year: 20 members in 2017, 23 in 2018, and 34 in 2019. For 2020, the Hall of Fame committee endorsed a special proposal by league president Lori Webb to induct Frances Crockett Ringley, baseball's first female general manager. Following the 2020 season, which was cancelled due to the COVID-19 pandemic before it began, Major League Baseball assumed control of Minor League Baseball. The Hall of Fame has since become dormant.

Sixteen Southern League Hall of Famers have also been inducted in the National Baseball Hall of Fame and Museum: Sparky Anderson, Rollie Fingers, Tom Glavine, Roy Halladay, Trevor Hoffman, Reggie Jackson, Randy Johnson, Chipper Jones, Harmon Killebrew, Tony La Russa, Edgar Martínez, Willie Mays, Ryne Sandberg, Frank Thomas, Alan Trammell, and Larry Walker.

== Inductees ==
Key
Year	The year of induction
Position(s)	The inductee's primary playing position or role
Team(s)	The team(s) for which the inductee was recognized
Method	Election method
BOD	Board of Directors
SCB	Special Consideration Ballot or special proposal
VC	Voting committee
†	Inductee is a member of the National Baseball Hall of Fame and Museum

Inductees
Year	Name	Position(s)	Team(s)	Career	Method	Ref(s).
2020	Sparky Anderson^{†}	Manager	Asheville Tourists	1968	VC	
2018	Curt Bloom	Broadcaster	Huntsville Stars/Birmingham Barons (Note: Curt Bloom was broadcaster for the Huntsville Stars in 1991 and the Birmingham Barons from 1992 to 2014.)	1991–2024	VC	
2014	Jim Bragan	League president	Southern League	1981–1994	BOD	
2016	Peter Bragan Jr.	Team president/owner	Jacksonville Suns	1985–2015	VC	
2014	Peter Bragan Sr.	Team president/owner	Jacksonville Suns	1984–2012	VC	
2015	Scott Brosius	Second baseman	Huntsville Stars	1989–1990	VC	
2014	J. Frank Burke	General manager/owner	Chattanooga Lookouts	1995–2014	VC	
2014	Mike Darr	Outfielder	Mobile BayBears	1998	VC	
2015	Carlos Delgado	Catcher	Knoxville Smokies	1993	VC	
2019	Joe Engel	Team president	Chattanooga Lookouts	1929–1965	SCB	
2015	Rollie Fingers^{†}	Pitcher	Birmingham A's	1967–1968	VC	
2018	Terry Francona	Outfielder/manager	Memphis Chicks/Birmingham Barons (Note: Terry Francona played for the Memphis Chicks from 1980 to 1981. He managed the Birmingham Barons from 1993 to 1995.)	1980–1981, 1993–1995	VC	
2018	Andrés Galarraga	First baseman	Jacksonville Suns	1984	VC	
2017	Tom Glavine^{†}	Pitcher	Greenville Braves	1986	VC	
2019	Roy Halladay^{†}	Pitcher	Knoxville/Tennessee Smokies	1997, 2001	VC	
2014	Billy Hitchcock	League president	Southern League	1971–1980	BOD	
2015	Trevor Hoffman^{†}	Pitcher	Chattanooga Lookouts	1991–1992	VC	
2014	Rosemary Hovatter	Team executive	Huntsville Stars	1985–2014	VC	
2014	Bo Jackson	Outfielder	Memphis Chicks	1986	VC	
2014	Reggie Jackson^{†}	Outfielder	Birmingham A's	1967	VC	
2015	Randy Johnson^{†}	Pitcher	Jacksonville Expos	1987	VC	
2015	Chipper Jones^{†}	Shortstop	Greenville Braves	1992	VC	
2017	Gabe Kapler	Outfielder	Jacksonville Suns	1998	VC	
2015	Jason Kendall	Catcher	Carolina Mudcats	1994–1995	VC	
2015	Harmon Killebrew^{†}	Third baseman	Chattanooga Lookouts	1957–1958	SCB	
2017	Tony La Russa^{†}	Second baseman/manager	Birmingham A's/Barons/Mobile A's/Knoxville Sox (Note: Tony La Russa played for the Birmingham A's in 1965, the Mobile A's in 1966, and the Birmingham Barons in 1967. He managed the Knoxville Sox in 1978.)	1965–1967, 1978	VC	
2020	Edgar Martínez^{†}	Third baseman	Chattanooga Lookouts	1985–1986	VC	
2018	Willie Mays^{†}	Outfielder	Birmingham Black Barons (Note: Willie Mays was nominated by the Birmingham Barons.)	1948–1950	SCB	
2014	Don Mincher	General manager/owner/league president	Huntsville Stars/Southern League (Note: Don Mincher was general manager of the Huntsville Stars from 1985 to 2000 and part owner from 1994 to 2000. He was league president from 2000 to 2011.)	1985–2011	BOD	
2014	Dale Murphy	Catcher	Savannah Braves	1976	VC	
2019	Sal Rende	First baseman/manager	Chattanooga Lookouts/Memphis Chicks (Note: Sal Rende played for the Chattanooga Lookouts from 1978 to 1982. He managed Chattanooga in 1987 and the Memphis Chicks in 1988.)	1978–1982, 1987–1988	VC	
2020	Frances Crockett Ringley	General manager/owner	Charlotte O's	1976–1987	SCB	
2014	Ryne Sandberg^{†}	Manager	Tennessee Smokies	2009	VC	
2016	Larry Schmittou	Team president/owner	Nashville Sounds	1978–1984	SCB	
2015	Razor Shines	First baseman/manager	Memphis Chicks/Birmingham Barons/Chattanooga Lookouts (Note: Razor Shines played for the Memphis Chicks from 1981 to 1983. He managed the Birmingham Barons from 2004 to 2005 and the Chattanooga Lookouts in 2014.)	1981–1983, 2004–2005, 2014	VC	
2016	John Shoemaker	Manager	Jacksonville Suns	2001, 2005–2008	VC	
2020	Brian Snitker	Manager	Greenville/Mississippi Braves (Note: Brian Snitker managed the Greenville Braves from 2002 to 2004 and the Mississippi Braves in 2005.)	2002–2005	VC	
2015	Frank Thomas^{†}	First baseman	Birmingham Barons	1990	VC	
2014	Alan Trammell^{†}	Shortstop	Montgomery Rebels	1976–1977	VC	
2020	Wade Vadakin	Batboy	Mobile BayBears	1998–2019	SCB	
2014	Tim Wakefield	Pitcher	Carolina Mudcats	1991, 1993	VC	
2019	Larry Walker^{†}	Outfielder	Jacksonville Expos	1987	VC	
2016	Larry Ward	Broadcaster	Chattanooga Lookouts	1989–present	VC	
2015	Turner Ward	Manager	Mobile BayBears	2011–2012	VC	
2015	Lou Whitaker	Second baseman	Montgomery Rebels	1977	VC	
