= Val Doonican =

Irish singer (1927–2015)

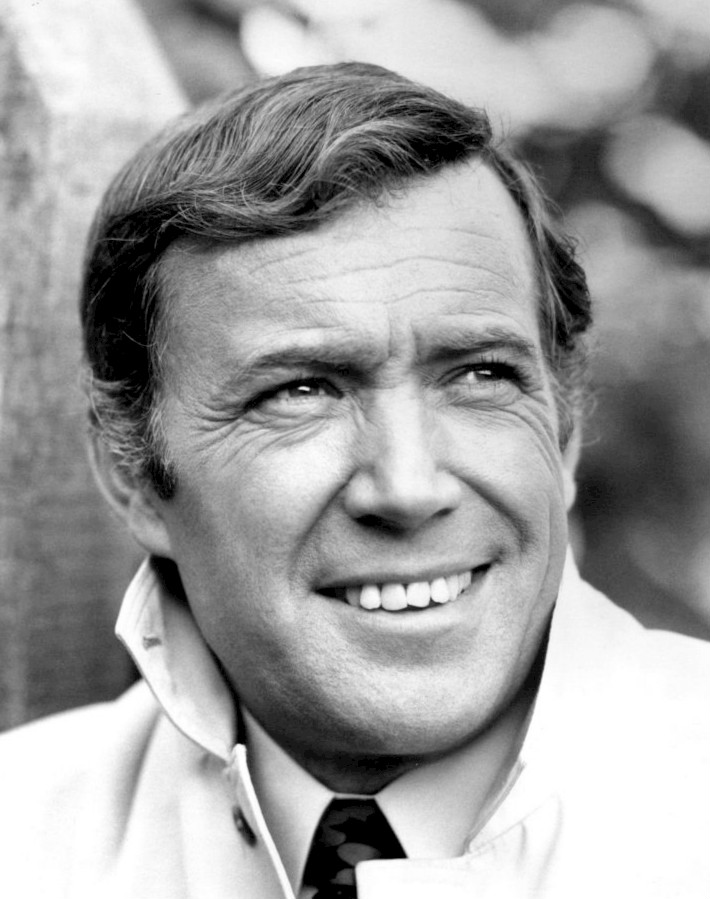
- Doonican in 1971

Background information
- Born: Michael Valentine Doonican; 3 February 1927; Waterford, Ireland
- Died: 1 July 2015 (aged 88) Buckinghamshire, England
- Genres: Traditional pop; easy listening; swing; country; novelty songs
- Years active: 1947–2009
- Labels: Decca, Pye, Philips, RCA, Parkfield
- Website: valdoonican.com

Michael Valentine 'Val' Doonican (3 February 1927 – 1 July 2015) was an Irish singer of traditional pop, easy listening and novelty songs, noted for his warm and relaxed vocal style.

A crooner, he found popular success, especially in the United Kingdom, where he had five successive Top 10 albums in the 1960s as well as several hits on the UK Singles Chart, including "Walk Tall", "Elusive Butterfly" and "If the Whole World Stopped Loving".

The Val Doonican Show, his eponymous variety programme, featured his singing and a selection of guests, and it had a long and successful run on BBC Television from 1965 to 1986. Doonican won the Variety Club of Great Britain's BBC-TV Personality of the Year award three times.

== Early years ==
Doonican was born on 3 February 1927 in Waterford, Ireland, the youngest of the eight children of Agnes (née Kavanagh) and John Doonican. He was from a musical family and played in his school band from the age of six.

When his father died in 1941, the teenage Doonican had to leave De La Salle College Waterford to get factory jobs fabricating steel and making orange and grapefruit boxes.

== Early career ==
He began to perform in his hometown, often with his friend Bruce Clarke, and they had their first professional engagement as a duo in 1947.

Doonican appeared in a summer season at Courtown Harbour, County Wexford. He was soon featured on Irish radio, sometimes with Clarke, and appeared in Waterford's first-ever television broadcast.

== Career in Britain ==
Doonican moved to England in 1951 and joined the Four Ramblers who, in addition to touring the variety stages, were featured on the BBC radio serial the Riders of the Range. In the radio serial, Doonican played one of a number of bunk-house boys who were heard crooning cowboy songs in the gaps between the action. The serial ended in September 1953, and the Ramblers continued to tour the variety theatres, being billed as Ireland's Ambassadors of Song. They also began performing at United States Air Force bases. The Ramblers kept busy for most of the 1950s and in 1960 they supported Anthony Newley on his tour. Recognising Doonican's talent and potential as a solo act, Newley persuaded him to leave the singing group and go solo.

He was auditioned for radio as a solo act and appeared on the radio show Variety Bandbox. Soon after his solo career started, he picked up his own radio show in the afternoons on the BBC Light Programme in 1961 called Your Date with Val. In 1962, he had also had a weekly show on Irish TV called Presenting Val Doonican. Variety and cabaret appearances increased, and he received good reviews following his appearance at London's Astor Club in March 1963.

In the late 1950s, Doonican became one of the artists managed by Eve Taylor, the self-described "Queen Bee" of show business, who remained his manager until her death.

After seeing him in a cabaret in London in 1964, impresario Val Parnell booked him to appear on Sunday Night at the Palladium on 31 May 1964. Most unusually, Doonican returned to the show the following week as well.

As a result of his performances, Bill Cotton, then Assistant Head of Light Entertainment at the BBC, offered Doonican his own regular show, Singalong Saturday, starting on 27 June 1964. The series was a success, and he was given another series on BBC1 called "Date with Doonican" starting on 22 February 1965. The TV shows were produced by Yvonne Littlewood and lasted for over 20 years. At their peak, the shows attracted audiences of some 19 million viewers. The shows featured his relaxed crooner style, sitting in a rocking chair wearing cardigans or jumpers, sometimes performing comedic Irish songs including "Paddy McGinty's Goat", "Delaney's Donkey" and "O'Rafferty's Motor Car", as well as easy listening and country material on which he accompanied himself on acoustic guitar. Doonican's songs about O'Rafferty were popular enough for the BBC to publish a book, Val Doonican Tells The Adventures of O'Rafferty, which retold five of the tales, in 1969.

As his TV programmes were variety shows they gave other performers, such as Dave Allen, early exposure. Regular guests included Bernard Cribbins, Bob Todd, the Norman Maen Dancers, the Mike Sammes Singers, and the Kenny Woodman Orchestra. At its height The Val Doonican Show, which featured both American and British acts, had 20 million viewers. In the United States, The Val Doonican Show aired on ABC on Saturday evenings at 8:30 p.m. (7:30 p.m. Central) from 5 June to 14 August 1971, as a summer replacement test of Doonican's appeal to American audiences.

The Palladium performance also kick-started his recording career. Between 1964 and 1973, Doonican was rarely out of the UK Singles Chart, his greatest successes including the singles "Walk Tall", "The Special Years", "Elusive Butterfly", "What Would I Be" (Decca), "If The Whole World Stopped Loving" (Pye), and "Morning" (Philips); and the albums 13 Lucky Shades of Val Doonican (Decca), and Val Doonican Rocks, But Gently (Pye) which reached number 1 in the UK Albums Chart in December 1967. The 1966 single release "Elusive Butterfly" reached a UK chart peak of number 5 and number 3 in Ireland. In all, he recorded over 50 albums. After a spell with Philips Records in the 1970s he also recorded for RCA. He also sang the theme song to the film Ring of Bright Water.

Behind the scenes, Doonican was described as "a perfectionist who knew his limitations but always aimed to be 'the best Val Doonican possible.'" He was sometimes compared to American singer Perry Como, though he claimed his main influence was Bing Crosby. He appeared in three Royal Variety Performances. On 31 December 1976, Doonican performed his hit song "Walk Tall" on BBC One's A Jubilee of Music, celebrating British pop music for Queen Elizabeth II's impending Silver Jubilee.

Doonican won the BBC Television Personality of the Year award in 1966. He was the subject of This Is Your Life in 1970. Eamonn Andrews, a fellow Irishman, met him at the 18th green of the South Herts Golf Club as Doonican played a round of golf. He wrote two volumes of autobiography, The Special Years (1980) and Walking Tall (1985)

== Personal life ==
Doonican met his wife, Lynette Rae, when she and the Ramblers supported Anthony Newley on tour. They married in 1962 and had three daughters, Siobhan (who died in 1964, aged seven months) Sarah and Fiona, as well as two grandchildren, Bethany and Scott. In later years they lived at Knotty Green in Beaconsfield, Buckinghamshire.

Doonican officially retired in 1990 but was still performing in 2009. He had a second home in Spain, and was a keen golfer and a talented watercolour painter. Another hobby he enjoyed was cooking. In June 2011, he was recognised by the Mayor of Waterford, who bestowed on him "The Freedom of the City".

== Death and tributes ==
Doonican died at a nursing home in Buckinghamshire on 1 July 2015, aged 88. His daughter Sarah told The Guardian: "Until 87, he was as fit as a flea. It was just old age, I'm afraid — the batteries ran out." Leading tributes to Doonican, fellow entertainer Bruce Forsyth said, "It is very sad. He was always a lovely man to work with ... He was a very warm person and number one in his field. He brought a lovely warmth with his personality and was a very popular man." Elaine Paige commented on Twitter, "Sad to hear of Val Doonican's passing ... RIP Val", while BBC disc-jockey Tony Blackburn said "So sad to hear that Val Doonican has passed away. He was a lovely man and a true professional who I worked with on several TV shows R.I.P."

== In popular culture ==
- Comic actor Russ Abbot parodied Doonican in his TV creation crooner "Val Hooligan".
- He appears as himself in the Bonzo Dog Doo-Dah Band's "The Intro and the Outro", saying "hello there" over the general hubbub.
- Doonican's 1965 song, "I'm Gonna Get There Somehow", has been used in adverts for Irish toy store Smyths. The same song was used in a Boots Christmas advert in 2023.
- Since 2006, his name has also been used by the Barnsley comedy-folk band The Bar-Steward Sons of Val Doonican, who celebrate Val's image, wearing loud-knitwear as part of their larger-than-life stage personas.

== Discography ==
=== Chart singles ===
Year	Single	Chart Positions		
Year	Single	UK	IRE	AU
1964	"Walk Tall"	3	2	29
1965	"The Special Years"	7	2	71
1965	"I'm Gonna Get There Somehow"	25	—	—
1966	"Elusive Butterfly"	5	3	—
1966	"What Would I Be"	2	—	26
1967	"Memories Are Made of This"	11	14	—
1967	"Two Streets"	39	—	—
1967	"If The Whole World Stopped Loving"	3	2	81
1968	"You're The Only One"	37	—	—
1968	"Now"	43	-	-
1968	"If I Knew Then What I Know Now"	14	—	—
1968	"Ring of Bright Water"	48	—	—
1970	"Too Many Times"	—	—	82
1971	"Ann"	—	—	95
1972	"Morning"	12	5	75
1973	"Heaven Is My Woman's Love"	34	—	—

=== Albums ===
- The Lucky 13 Shades of Val Doonican (Decca, 1964, UK albums chart No. 2)
- Gentle Shades of Val Doonican (Decca, 1966, UK albums chart No. 5)
- Val Doonican Rocks, But Gently (Pye, 1967, UK albums chart No. 1)
- Val (Pye, 1968, UK albums chart No. 6)
- The World of Val Doonican (Decca, 1969, UK albums chart No. 2, AUS albums chart No. 24)
- Sounds Gentle (Pye, 1969, UK albums chart No. 22)
- Especially For You (Contour, 1970)
- If The Whole World Stopped Loving (Contour, 1970)
- Gentle On My Mind (Contour, 1970)
- The Blue And The Grey – Songs From The American Civil War (with the George Mitchell Singers, World Record Club, 1970)
- The Magic of Val Doonican (Philips, 1970, UK albums chart No. 34)
- This Is Val Doonican (Philips, 1971, UK albums chart No. 40)
- This Is Val Doonican, Vol.2 (Philips, 1971)
- Just A Sittin' And A Rockin' (Philips 1971)
- Morning In The Country (Philips, 1972)
- Morning Has Broken (Philips, 1972)
- Rocking Chair Favourites (Philips, 1973)
- I Love Country Music (Philips, 1975, UK albums chart No. 37)
- Life Can Be Beautiful (Philips, 1976)
- Some of My Best Friends Are Songs (Philips, 1977, UK albums chart No. 29)
- Mr. Music Man (Pickwick, 1981)
- Quiet Moments (RCA, 1981)
- Val Sings Bing (RCA, 1982, AUS albums chart No. 84)
- 20 Shades of Green (J&B, 1983 AUS albums chart No. 24)
- At His Very Best (J&B, 1983 AUS albums chart No. 33)
- Some of My Best Friends Are Songs (J&B, 1986 AUS albums chart No. 63)
- Songs From My Sketchbook (Parkfield, 1990, UK albums chart No. 33)
- The Very Best of Bing Crosby & Val Doonican (J&B, 1991 AUS albums chart No. 85)
- The Very Best of Val Doonican (UMTV, 2008, UK albums chart No. 33)

== Other sources ==
- Legends – Val Doonican, (BBC Four), December 2007
- Brooks, T. and Marsh, E. The Complete Directory to Prime Time Network and Cable TV Shows (1998)
