= Country Bumpkin =

Single by Cal Smith

from the album Country Bumpkin
- B-side: "It's Not the Miles You've Traveled"
- Released: February 1974
- Recorded: December 21, 1973
- Studio: Bradley's Barn, Mount Juliet, Tennessee
- Genre: Country
- Length: 3:39
- Label: MCA Records 40191
- Songwriter: Don Wayne
- Producer: Walter Haynes

Cal Smith singles chronology
"Bleep You" / "An Hour and a Six Pack" (1973)	"Country Bumpkin" (1974)	"Between Lust and Watching TV" (1974)

"Country Bumpkin" is a song written by Don Wayne, and recorded by American country music artist Cal Smith. It was released in February 1974 as the first single and title track from the album Country Bumpkin. The song was Smith's second number one on the country chart. The single stayed at number one for a single week and spent a total of ten weeks on the country chart.

In 1974, "Country Bumpkin" received Song of the Year Awards from both the Academy of Country Music and the Country Music Association.

== Content ==
The song has three verses:

- In the first a rural gentleman walks into a bar, where one of the barroom girls refers to him as a "country bumpkin" (a common nickname for a person from a rural area) as she talks to him.
- The second verse discusses the woman (now married to the man) giving birth to her (only) son a year later.
- The third verse discusses her impending death 40 years later, with her husband and son present at her bedside.

== Chart performance ==
=== Weekly charts ===
Chart (1974/75)	Peak position
Australia (Kent Music Report)	23
US Hot Country Songs (Billboard)	1
Canadian RPM Country Tracks	2

=== Year-end charts ===
Chart (1975)	Peak position
Australia (Kent Music Report)	90
