= Larry MacPhail Award =

Award for the top promotional effort in Minor League Baseball

- Sport: Baseball
- League: Minor League Baseball
- Awarded for: The top promotional effort in Minor League Baseball
- Country: United States; Canada; Mexico
- Presented by: Minor League Baseball

History
- First award: Spartanburg Phillies (1966)
- Final award: Lehigh Valley IronPigs (2019)
- Most wins: Columbus Clippers (3); El Paso Diablos (3); Nashville Sounds (3)

The Larry MacPhail Award was presented annually from 1966 to 2019 by Minor League Baseball to recognize "a club that demonstrates outstanding and creative marketing and promotional efforts within its community, its ballpark (including non-game day events), in media, and other promotional materials". The award was named in honor of Baseball Hall of Fame member Larry MacPhail, a baseball executive who was considered an innovator in the sport, particularly in the areas of marketing and promotion. It was usually presented during baseball's Winter Meetings.

No award was given in 2020 after the cancellation of the minor league season due to the COVID-19 pandemic. In 2021, Major League Baseball assumed control of the minor leagues and the honor was discontinued. The Golden Bobblehead Awards, previously issued at the annual Minor League Baseball Innovators Summit, began to be issued at the Winter Meetings in place of the Larry MacPhail Award to recognize the top promotional efforts in the minors.

Forty-six teams won the Larry MacPhail Award. The Columbus Clippers, El Paso Diablos, and Nashville Sounds each won the award on three occasions, more than any other teams, followed by the Charleston RiverDogs, Hawaii Islanders, Reading Phillies, Richmond Braves, and Rochester Red Wings, who each won the award twice. International League teams won the award eight times, more than any other league, followed by the Eastern League, Pacific Coast League, Southern League, and Texas League (6); the American Association, Florida State League, and Midwest League (4); the Pioneer League and South Atlantic League (3); the California League and New York–Penn League (2); and the Carolina League, Northwestern League, and Western Carolinas League (1). Eighteen teams competed at the Triple-A and Double-A classification levels, more than any other classes, followed by Class A (10); Class A-Advanced (5); and Class A Short Season and Rookie (3).

== Winners ==
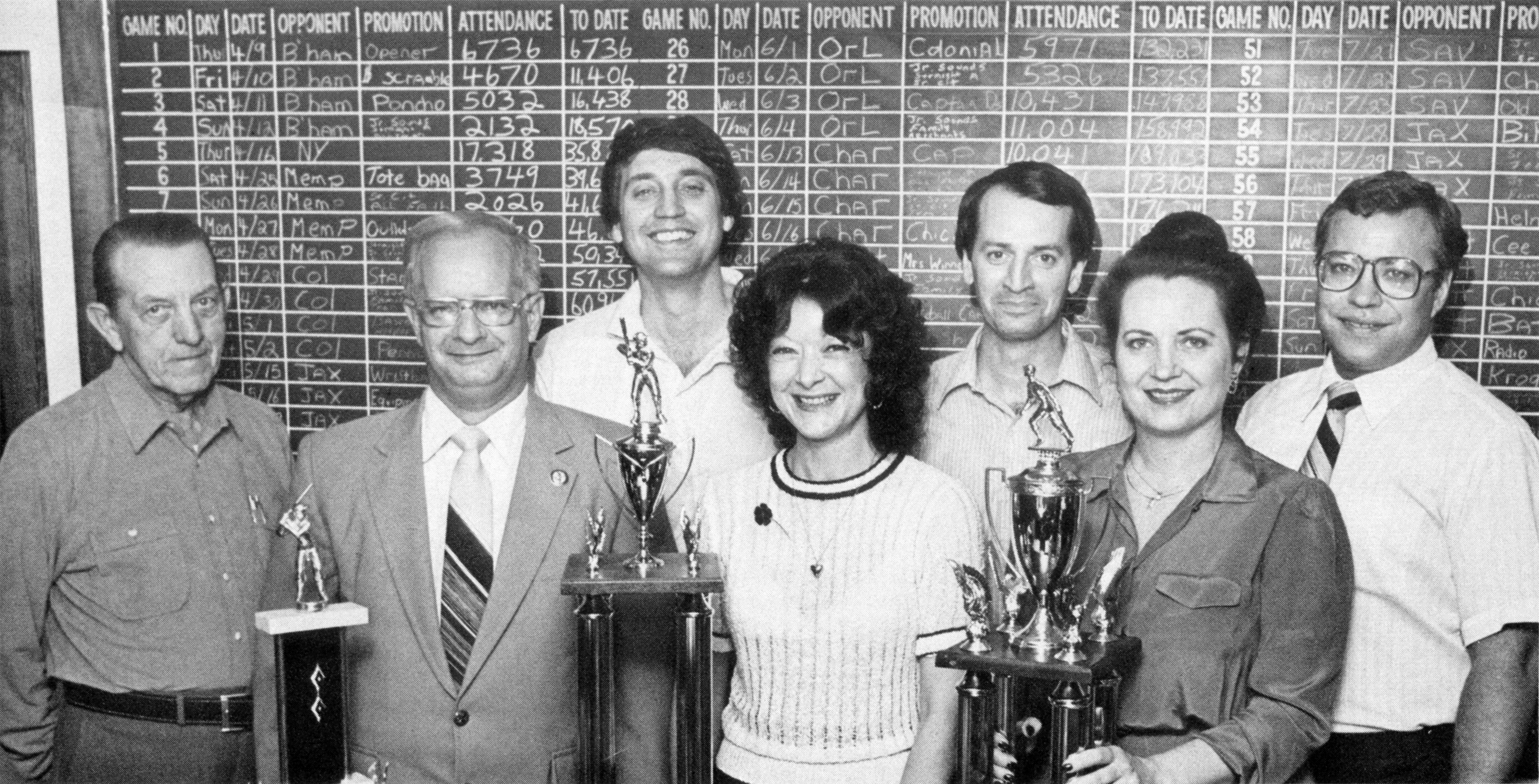
The Nashville Sounds' front office staff posing with their three Larry MacPhail Awards (1978, 1980, & 1981)

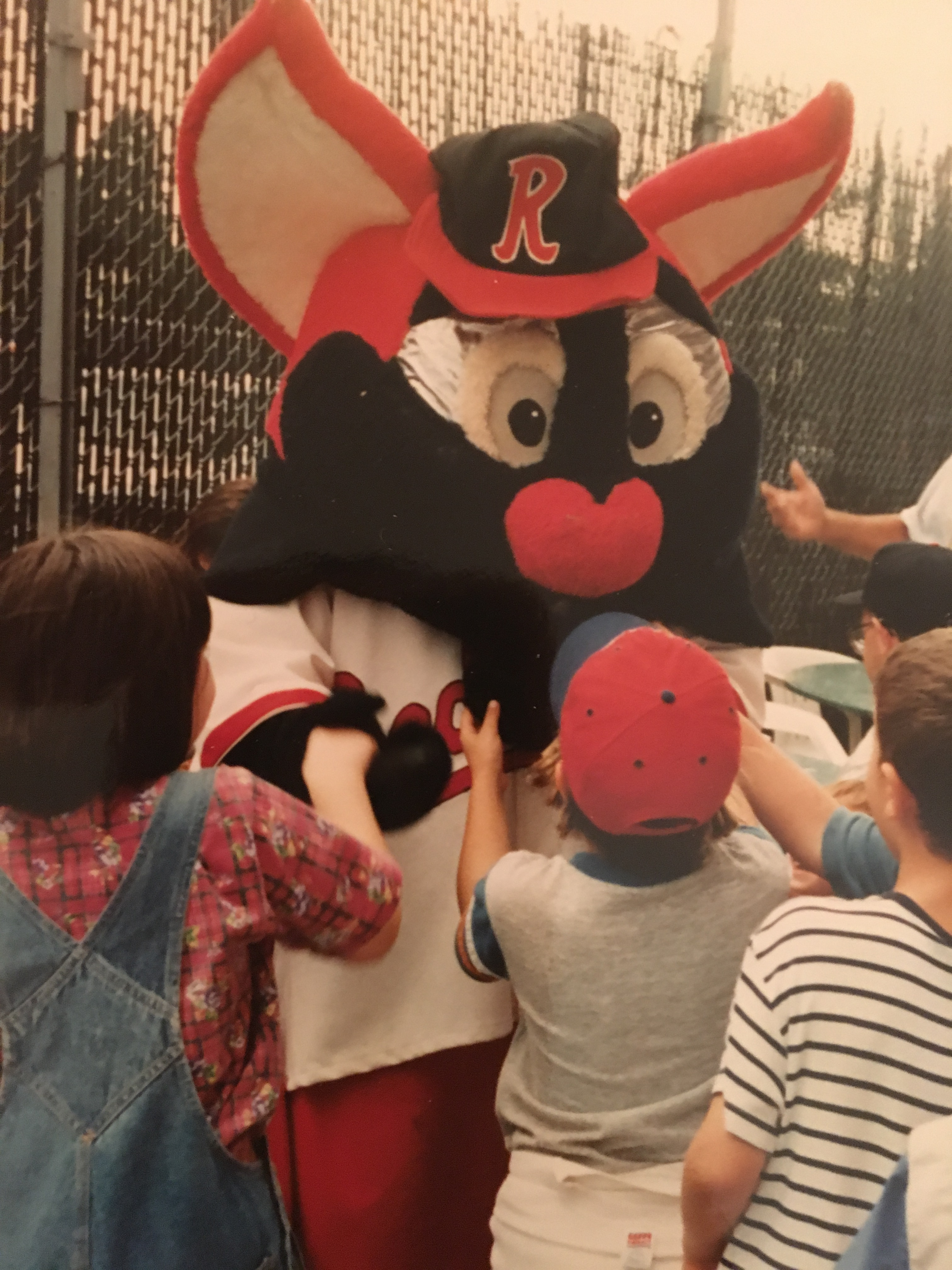
Wild Fang, mascot of the Rochester Red Wings meeting young fans

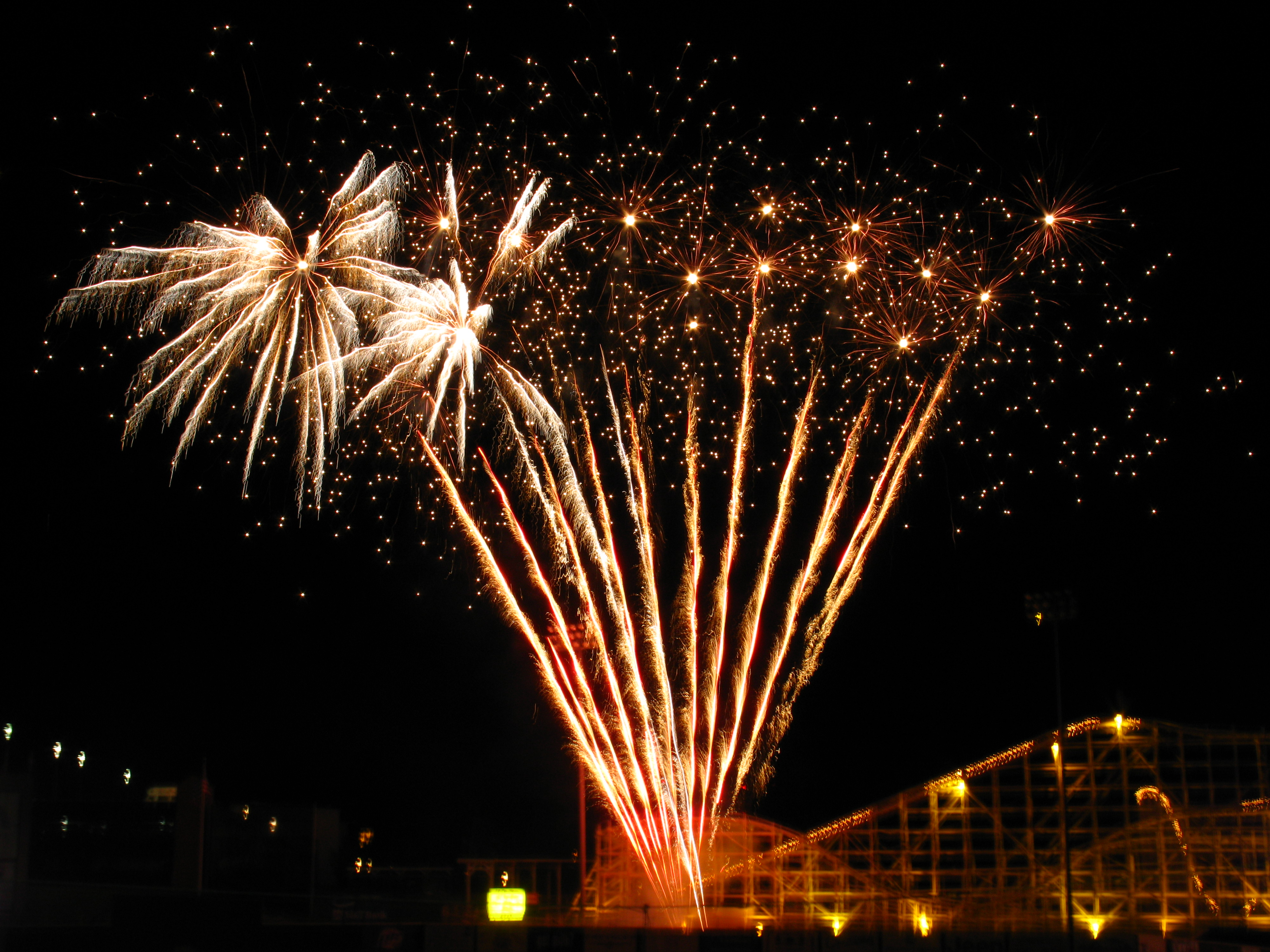
Postgame fireworks at Blair County Ballpark, home of the Altoona Curve

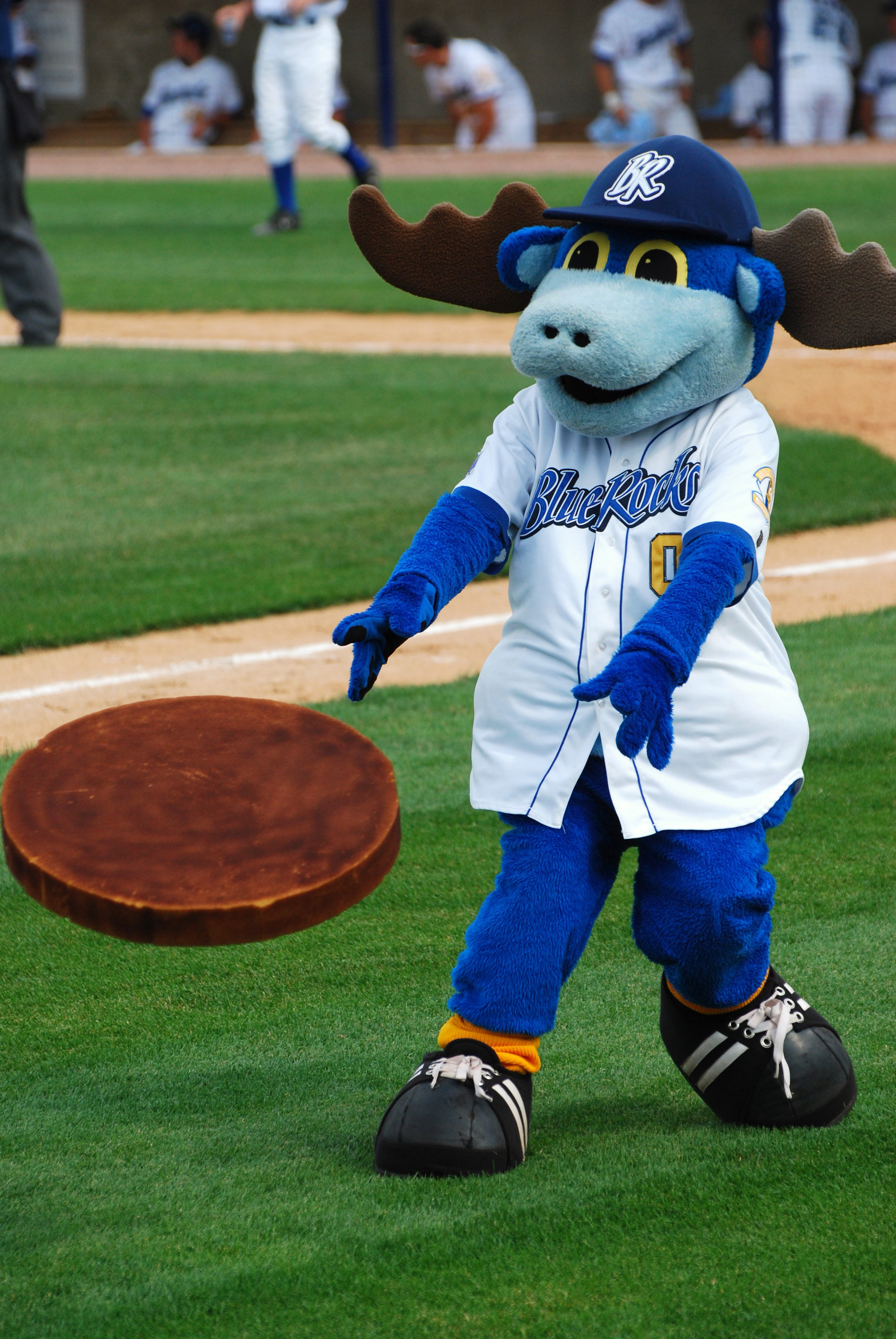
Rocky Bluewinkle, mascot of the Wilmington Blue Rocks, plays a promotional game in-between innings

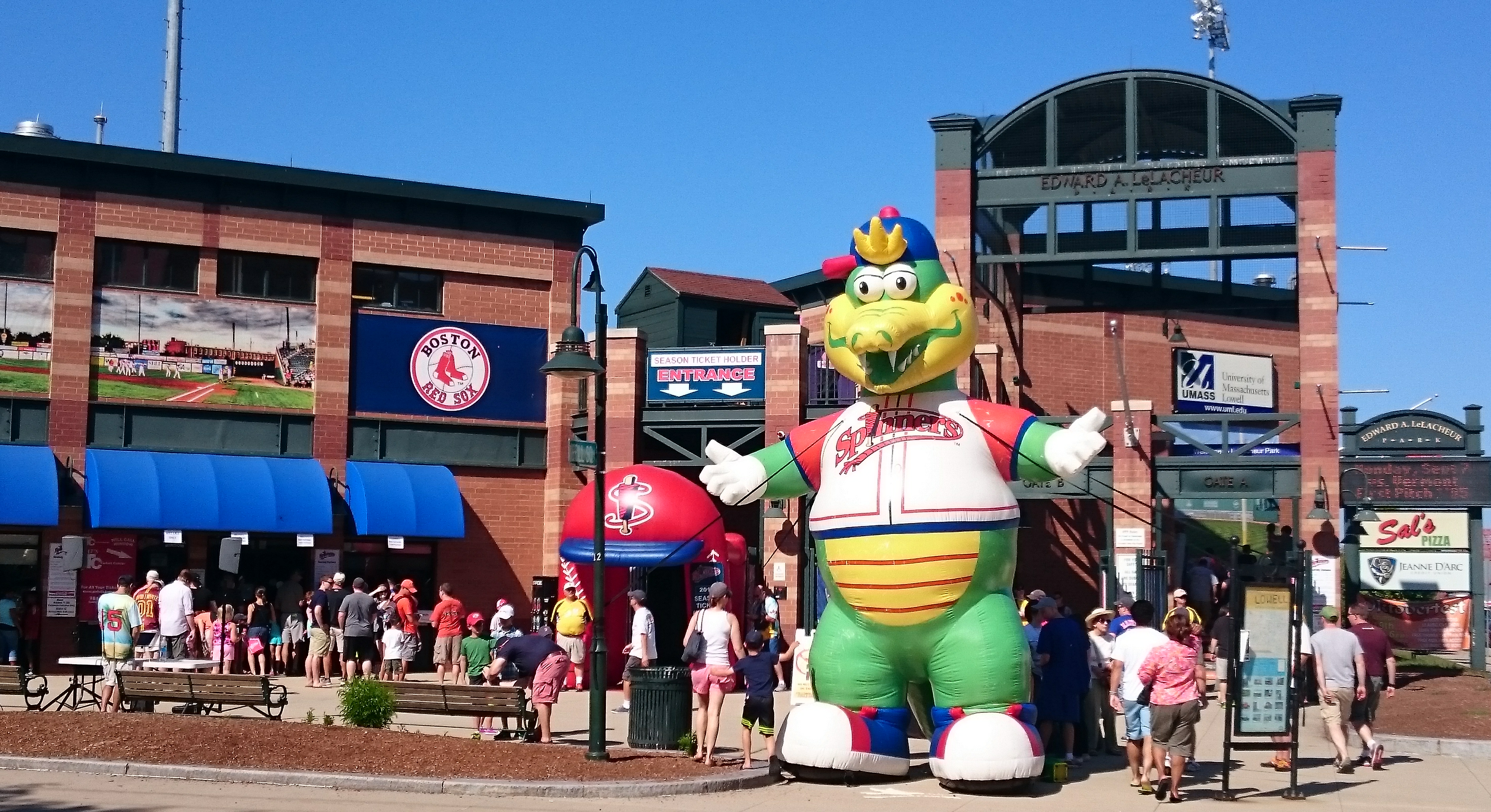
An inflatable Canaligator, mascot of the Lowell Spinners, greeting fans outside of Edward A. LeLacheur Park

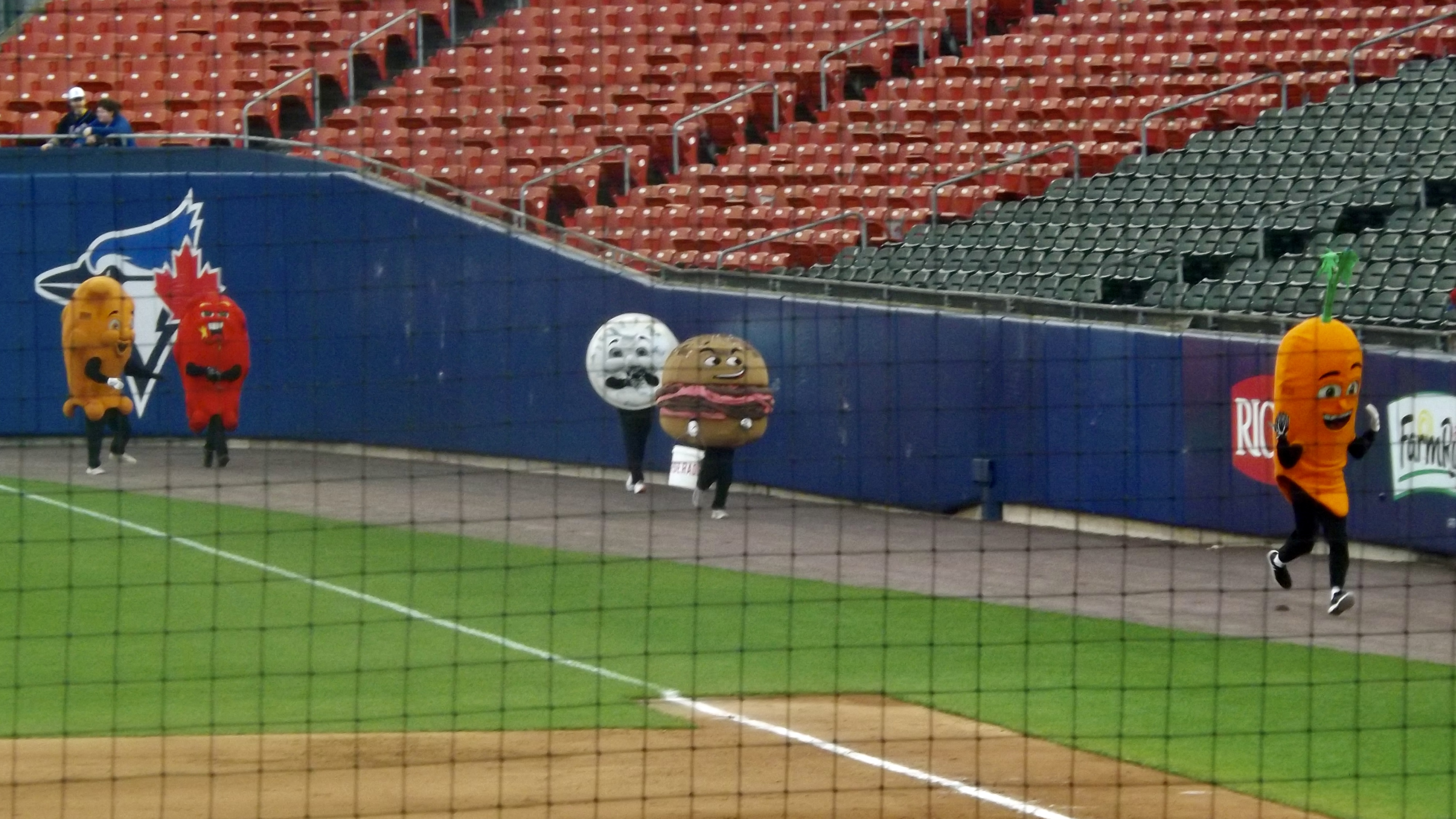
A mascot race at the Buffalo Bisons' Sahlen Field featuring (from left) two Buffalo wings, bleu cheese, a beef on weck sandwich, and a carrot

Key
(#)	Number of wins by teams who won the award multiple times
^	Indicates multiple award winners in the same year

Winners
Year	Team	League	Class	Ref.
1966	Spartanburg Phillies	Western Carolinas League	Class A	
1967	Rochester Red Wings (1)	International League	Triple-A	
1968	Cocoa Astros	Florida State League	Class A	
1969	Hawaii Islanders (1)	Pacific Coast League	Triple-A	
1970^	Hawaii Islanders (2)	Pacific Coast League	Triple-A	
1970^	Wichita Aeros	American Association	Triple-A	
1971	Oklahoma City 89ers	American Association	Triple-A	
1972	San Antonio Brewers	Texas League	Double-A	
1973	Tucson Toros	Pacific Coast League	Triple-A	
1974	West Palm Beach Expos	Florida State League	Class A	
1975	Tacoma Twins	Pacific Coast League	Triple-A	
1976^	Cedar Rapids Giants	Midwest League	Class A	
1976^	El Paso Diablos (1)	Texas League	Double-A	
1977	Columbus Clippers (1)	International League	Triple-A	
1978	Nashville Sounds (1)	Southern League	Double-A	
1979	Columbus Clippers (2)	International League	Triple-A	
1980	Nashville Sounds (2)	Southern League	Double-A	
1981	Nashville Sounds (3)	Southern League	Double-A	
1982	El Paso Diablos (2)	Texas League	Double-A	
1983	Arkansas Travelers	Texas League	Double-A	
1984^	Billings Mustangs	Pioneer League	Rookie	
1984^	Columbus Clippers (3)	International League	Triple-A	
1985	Richmond Braves (1)	International League	Triple-A	
1986	Iowa Cubs	American Association	Triple-A	
1987	Albuquerque Dukes	Pacific Coast League	Triple-A	
1988	Birmingham Barons	Southern League	Double-A	
1989	Buffalo Bisons	American Association	Triple-A	
1990	Richmond Braves (2)	International League	Triple-A	
1991	Salt Lake City Trappers	Pioneer League	Rookie	
1992	Fort Myers Miracle	Florida State League	Class A-Advanced	
1993	El Paso Diablos (3)	Texas League	Double-A	
1994	Reading Phillies (1)	Eastern League	Double-A	
1995	Kane County Cougars	Midwest League	Class A	
1996	Wilmington Blue Rocks	Carolina League	Class A-Advanced	
1997	Rochester Red Wings (2)	International League	Triple-A	
1998	Charleston RiverDogs (1)	South Atlantic League	Class A	
1999	Reading Phillies (2)	Eastern League	Double-A	
2000	Lowell Spinners	New York–Penn League	Class A Short Season	
2001	Tennessee Smokies	Southern League	Double-A	
2002	Lakewood BlueClaws	South Atlantic League	Class A	
2003	Trenton Thunder	Eastern League	Double-A	
2004	Altoona Curve	Eastern League	Double-A	
2005	Brevard County Manatees	Florida State League	Class A-Advanced	
2006	Round Rock Express	Pacific Coast League	Triple-A	
2007	West Michigan Whitecaps	Midwest League	Class A	
2008	Ogden Raptors	Pioneer League	Rookie	
2009	Chattanooga Lookouts	Southern League	Double-A	
2010	New Hampshire Fisher Cats	Eastern League	Double-A	
2011	Lake Elsinore Storm	California League	Class A-Advanced	
2012	Wisconsin Timber Rattlers	Midwest League	Class A	
2013	Charleston RiverDogs (2)	South Atlantic League	Class A	
2014	San Jose Giants	California League	Class A-Advanced	
2015	Akron RubberDucks	Eastern League	Double-A	
2016	Midland RockHounds	Texas League	Double-A	
2017	Brooklyn Cyclones	New York–Penn League	Class A Short Season	
2018	Eugene Emeralds	Northwestern League	Class A Short Season	
2019	Lehigh Valley IronPigs	International League	Triple-A	
