= Cal Smith =

American country music singer (1932–2013)

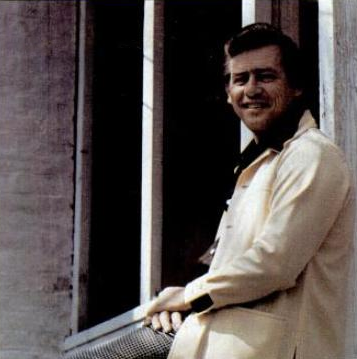
- Cal Smith in 1974

Background information
- Born: Calvin Grant Shofner; April 7, 1932; Gans, Oklahoma, U.S.
- Died: October 10, 2013 (aged 81) Branson, Missouri, U.S.
- Genres: Country
- Occupation: Singer
- Instrument(s): Guitar, vocals
- Years active: 1955-1957, 1966-2013
- Labels: Kapp, Decca, MCA, Soundwaves, Step One

Calvin Grant Shofner (April 7, 1932 – October 10, 2013), known professionally as Cal Smith, was an American country musician.

== Career ==
Calvin Grant Shofner was born on April 7, 1932, in Gans, Oklahoma, as the youngest of three sons of James "Otto" and Ethel (Quinn) Shofner. During the Great Depression, the Smiths headed west and settled in Oakland, California, and he grew up in San Jose, California. Smith began his music career performing at the Remember Me Cafe in San Francisco at the age of 15, but he was not financially successful at first. Throughout the 1950s, he was not able to continue his music career, so he worked at various other jobs, including truck driving and bronco busting. He appeared on the California Hayride television show in the mid-1950s before serving two years in the military.

After his discharge, he began playing in a band in the San Francisco Bay Area. In 1961, country music legend Ernest Tubb heard the band play, and after an audition, hired Smith to play guitar for his Texas Troubadours; Smith is heard playing in most of Tubb's 1960s recordings. His first solo single was "Tear Stained Pillow" / "Eleven Long Years" on the local Plaid label. Smith's stage name began to catch on after he released his second solo single, "I'll Just Go Home", in 1966 for Kapp Records, and he first cracked the Billboard chart with his second single, "The Only Thing I Want".

Smith permanently parted ways with Tubb and the Texas Troubadours in 1969 and he released his first solo album, Drinking Champagne, in 1969. The album's title track had reached the top 40 on the country chart the previous year, and was later a top-10 hit for George Strait in 1990.

In 1970, Smith signed with Decca Records, and his popularity quickly soared, starting off with his 1972 top-10 hit, "I've Found Someone of My Own". He began recording songs written by some of the biggest names in the industry; for instance, in March 1973, his rendition of Bill Anderson's "The Lord Knows I'm Drinking" became his first number-one country hit. When Decca became MCA Records in 1973, he enjoyed his biggest successes. In 1974, he recorded two of his greatest hits, "It's Time to Pay the Fiddler" and "Country Bumpkin", which received Song of the Year Awards from both the Academy of Country Music and the Country Music Association.

== Later career ==
Smith continued to have success with MCA Records into the late 1970s, including the top-20 singles "Between Lust and Watching TV" (1974), "She Talked a Lot About Texas" (1975), "I Just Came Home to Count the Memories" (1977), and "Come See About Me" (1977). After this, he continued to have minor successes that included "The Rise and Fall of the Roman Empire" in 1979. Smith released his last album, Stories of Life by Cal Smith, in 1986 on Step One Records, where he scored a minor hit that year with "King Lear".

== Personal life ==
In 1977, Smith joined entrepreneur Larry Schmittou and other country music stars, such as Conway Twitty, Jerry Reed, Larry Gatlin, and Richard Sterban, as investors in the Nashville Sounds, a minor league baseball team of the Double-A Southern League that began play in 1978.

Smith and his wife, Darlene, lived in the Branson, Missouri, area. Smith died in Branson on October 10, 2013. He was survived by Darlene, his son Calvin, five grandchildren, and 15 great-grandchildren. He was preceded in death by a son, Jimmie Todd.

== Discography ==
=== Albums ===
Year	Album	Chart Positions			Label
Year	Album	US Country	US	AUS	Label
1966	All the World Is Lonely Now	40	—	—	Kapp
1967	Goin' to Cal's Place	31	—	—	Kapp
1968	Travelin' Man	34	—	—	Kapp
1968	At Home with Cal	—	—	—	Kapp
1968	Drinking Champagne	33	—	—	Kapp
1969	Cal Smith Sings	34	170	—	Kapp
1970	Country Hit Parade	—	—	—	Kapp
1971	The Best of Cal Smith	41	—	—	Kapp
1972	I've Found Someone of My Own	5	191	—	Decca
1973	Cal Smith	20	—	—	MCA
1974	Country Bumpkin	4	—	50	MCA
1975	It's Time to Pay the Fiddler	8	—	—	MCA
1975	My Kind of Country	17	—	—	MCA
1976	Jason's Farm	16	—	—	MCA
1977	I Just Came Home to Count the Memories	38	—	—	MCA
1986	Stories of Life	—	—	—	Step One
1998	Cal Smith	—	—	—	First Generation

=== Singles ===
Year	Single	Chart Positions			Album
Year	Single	US Country	CAN Country	AUS	Album
1966	"Silver Dew On the Bluegrass Tonight"	—	—	—	single only
1967	"The Only Thing I Want"	58	—	—	All the World Is Lonely Now
1967	"I'll Never Be Lonesome with You"	61	—	—	Goin' to Cal's Place
1967	"I'll Sail My Ship Alone"	—	—	—	Goin' to Cal's Place
1968	"Destination Atlanta G.A."	60	—	—	Travelin' Man
1968	"Jacksonville"	58	—	—	At Home with Cal
1968	"Drinking Champagne"	35	—	—	Drinking Champagne
1969	"Empty Arms"	—	—	—	Drinking Champagne
1969	"It Takes All Night Long"	51	—	—	Cal Smith Sings
1969	"You Can't Housebreak a Tomcat"	55	—	—	The Best of Cal Smith
1970	"Heaven Is Just a Touch Away"	47	—	—	The Best of Cal Smith
1970	"The Difference Between Going and Really Gone"	70	—	—	The Best of Cal Smith
1971	"That's What It's Like to Be Lonesome"	58	41	—	I've Found Someone of My Own
1971	"Free Streets"	—	—	—	singles only
1971	"Save My Wife"	—	—	—	singles only
1972	"I've Found Someone of My Own"	4	13	—	I've Found Someone of My Own
1972	"For My Baby"	58	—	—	I've Found Someone of My Own
1973	"The Lord Knows I'm Drinking"^{A}	1	2	—	I've Found Someone of My Own
1973	"I Can Feel the Leavin' Coming On"	25	39	—	Cal Smith
1973	"I've Loved You All Over the World"	flip	—	—	Cal Smith
1973	"Bleep You"	63	—	—	Cal Smith
1973	"An Hour and a Six-Pack"	flip	95	—	Cal Smith
1974	"Country Bumpkin"	1	2	23	Country Bumpkin
1974	"Between Lust and Watching TV"	11	15	62	Country Bumpkin
1975	"It's Time to Pay the Fiddler"	1	1	—	It's Time to Pay the Fiddler
1975	"She Talked a Lot About Texas"	13	5	—	It's Time to Pay the Fiddler
1975	"Jason's Farm"	12	7	—	Jason's Farm
1976	"Thunderstorms"	33	22	—	Jason's Farm
1976	"MacArthur's Hand"	43	47	—	Jason's Farm
1976	"Woman Don't Try to Sing My Song"	38	—	—	I Just Came Home to Count the Memories
1977	"I Just Came Home to Count the Memories"	15	10	—	I Just Came Home to Count the Memories
1977	"Come See About Me"	23	47	—	I Just Came Home to Count the Memories
1977	"Helen"	53	—	—	singles only
1978	"Throwin' Memories On the Fire"	51	—	—	singles only
1978	"I'm Just a Farmer"	73	—	—	singles only
1978	"Bits and Pieces of Life"	68	—	—	singles only
1979	"The Rise and Fall of the Roman Empire"	71	—	—	singles only
1979	"One Little Skinny Rib"	91	42	—	singles only
1979	"The Room at the Top of the Stairs"	92	—	—	singles only
1982	"If I Ever Need a Lady" (w/ Billy Parker)	53	—	—	singles only
1982	"Too Many Irons in the Fire" (w/ Billy Parker)	68	—	—	singles only
1986	"I Know It's Not Over"	—	—	—	Stories of Life
1986	"King Lear"	75	—	—	Stories of Life
1998	"The Arizona Whiz"	—	—	—	Cal Smith

- ^{A}"The Lord Knows I'm Drinking" also peaked at No. 64 on the Billboard Hot 100.

== Awards and nominations ==
=== Music City News Country Awards ===
Year	Nominee / work	Award	Result
1968	Cal Smith	Most Promising Male Artist	Won

=== Academy of Country Music Awards ===
Year	Nominee / work	Award	Result
1975	"Country Bumpkin"	Single Record of the Year	Won
1975	"Country Bumpkin"	Song of the Year	Won
1975	Cal Smith	Top Male Vocalist of the Year	Nominated
1975	Country Bumpkin	Album of the Year	Nominated

=== Country Music Association Awards ===
Year	Nominee / work	Award	Result
1973	"The Lord Knows I'm Drinking"	Single of the Year	Nominated
1974	"Country Bumpkin"	Single of the Year	Won
1974	Country Bumpkin	Album of the Year	Nominated
1974	Cal Smith	Male Vocalist of the Year	Nominated
