= Greer (surname) =

Greer is a surname. Notable people with the surname include:

- A. J. Greer (born 1996), Canadian professional ice hockey forward
- Allen J. Greer, officer in the United States Army who received the Medal of Honor
- Andrew Greer (born 1982), touring singer-songwriter living in Nashville, Tennessee
- Andrew Sean Greer (born 1970), American novelist and short story writer
- Andy Greer (born 1962), American basketball coach
- Arthur Greer, 1st Baron Fairfield (1863–1945), British lawyer and judge
- Big John Greer (1923–1972), American blues tenor saxophonist and vocalist
- Bill Greer (editor), of the Miami Herald
- Billy Greer (born 1952), bass guitarist for the band Kansas from 1985 to 2024
- Bonnie Greer (born 1948), American-British playwright, novelist, critic, broadcaster
- Breaux Greer (born 1976), American male javelin thrower
- Brian Greer (born 1959), Major League Baseball player
- Brian Greer (ice hockey) (born 1974), Canadian professional ice hockey goaltender
- Brodie Greer (born 1949), American actor
- Bruce Greer (born 1961), American pianist, singer and composer
- Caitlin Greer (born 20th century), American actress and voice-over artist
- Charlie Greer (1946–1999), American football defensive back
- Christina Greer, American political scientist
- Craig Greer (born 1964), American country music artist known professionally as Craig Morgan
- Curtis Greer (born 1957), American football player
- D. M. W. Greer (born 1957), American playwright
- Dabbs Greer (1917–2007), American actor in film and TV for over 50 years
- Dan Greer (1959–2003), American professional wrestler, known by ring names Danny Fargo and Dan Greer
- Daniel Greer, the founder of the Yeshiva of New Haven and rapist
- Darren Greer (born 1968), Canadian writer
- David Greer (physician), of International Physicians for the Prevention of Nuclear War (IPPNW)
- David Hummell Greer (1844–1919), American Protestant Episcopal bishop of New York
- Deborah A. Greer (born 1950), United States senator from Michigan (Democratic Party)
- Donovan Greer (born 1974), American football cornerback
- Douglas Greer (1921–2016), American child actor
- Ed Greer (1865–1890), Major League Baseball player
- Edward Greer (1924–2025), United States Army major general
- Elijah Greer (born 1990), American middle distance runner, specializes in the 800 m
- Elkanah Greer (1825–1877), general in the Confederate States Army in the American Civil War
- Emily Greer of Kongregate, a mobile and PC publisher and web gaming portal
- Felicia Greer, road cyclist from Canada
- Frances Greer (1917–2005), American soprano
- Francis Greer (1869–1925), British barrister and civil servant
- Frank Greer, various including:
  - Frank Greer (1879–1943), American rower who competed in the 1904 Summer Olympics
  - Frank Hilton Greer (1862–1933), American newspaperman and politician
- George Greer (born 1942), Florida circuit judge
- Germaine Greer (born 1939), Australian feminist writer, activist and academic
- Gillian Greer, New Zealand literary scholar
- Gloria Greer (1908–1931), American actress
- Gordon Greer (born 1980), Scottish footballer
- Hal Greer (1936–2018), American basketball player
- Harry Greer (1876–1947), British businessman and Conservative politician
- Henry Greer (field hockey) (1899–1978), American field hockey player, competed in the 1932 Summer Olympics
- Henry Greer (politician) (1855–1933), Irish soldier, politician, and racing horse owner and breeder
- Herschel Lynn Greer (1906–1976), American businessman from Nashville, Tennessee
- Howard E. Greer (1921–2015), vice admiral in the United States Navy
- Howard Greer (1896–1974), Hollywood fashion designer, costume designer for the cinema
- Hugh Greer (1902–1963), basketball coach from 1946 to 1963
- Ian Greer (1933–2015), British political lobbyist, affected by the cash-for-questions affair
- Ian Greer (obstetrician) (born 1958), medical doctor, Vice-Chancellor of Queen's University Belfast
- J. J. Greer (born 1991), American soccer player
- J. Ronnie Greer (born 1952), United States District Judge in Tennessee
- Jabari Greer (born 1982), American football cornerback
- James Greer, various including:
  - James Augustin Greer (1833–1904), rear admiral in the United States Navy, served during the Civil War
  - James Greer (writer) (born 1971), American novelist, screenwriter, musician and critic
  - James Greer, a fictional Vice Admiral in Tom Clancy's novel Clear and Present Danger and the movie based upon it
- Jamieson Greer, 20th US Trade Representative, 2025 - present
- Jane Greer (1924–2001), American film and TV actress
- Jane Greer (poet) (1953–2025), American poet
- Jim and Emily Greer, co-creators of Kongregate
- Jeff Greer (born 1964), American politician, Democratic member of the Kentucky House of Representatives
- Jesse Greer (1896–1970), American Broadway songwriter
- Jim Greer (born 1962), American politician and businessman
- Jo Ann Greer (1927–2001), American singer
- John Greer, various including:
  - John Alexander Greer (1802–1855), Texan politician, second Lieutenant Governor of Texas
  - John Greer (Minister), of the Free Presbyterian Church of Ulster
  - John Greer (sculptor), Canadian sculptor
  - John Michael Greer (born 1962), American author
- Joseph Greer (1754–1831), the Kings Mountain Messenger, told the Continental Congress in 1780 of victory over the British
- Joyce Greer de Holesch (1918–2009), Australian concert pianist
- Judy Greer (born 1975), American actress, model and author
- Ken Greer (born 1954), Canadian guitarist and keyboardist
- Kenny Greer, Major League Baseball pitcher
- LaMarr Greer (born 1976), American basketball player
- Lloyd Greer (1885–1952), American architect in Valdosta, Georgia during the first half of the twentieth century
- Lynn Greer (born 1979), American professional basketball player
- Lynn Greer (politician) (born 1941), American politician
- Michael Greer (1938–2002), American actor, comedian and cabaret performer
- Miyu Greer, fictional character in My-HiME
- Nicole Greer, American politician
- Pamela Greer, British actress
- Peter Greer (born 1975), Christian advocate for those living in poverty, president and CEO of HOPE International
- Ray Greer, game designer
- Rebecca Greer (born 1936), American nonfiction writer, editor of Woman's Day magazine
- Ricardo Greer (born 1977), Dominican-American professional basketball player
- Richard Greer, motorcycle speedway rider in the 1970s and 1980s
- Robin Greer, American actress, noted for her roles in television soap operas
- Ron Greer (Wisconsin politician)
- Ronald Greer (Stargate), fictional character from the science fiction TV series Stargate Universe
- Rosey Greer (born 1932), American actor, singer, Protestant minister, former professional American football player
- Ross Greer (footballer) (born 1967), Australian association football player
- Ross Greer (politician) (born 1994), Scottish Green Party politician, Member of the Scottish Parliament
- Rusty Greer (born 1969), Major League Baseball outfielder
- Samuel MacCurdy Greer (1810–1880), Irish politician
- Sandra C. Greer (born 1945), American physical chemist at the University of Maryland, College Park and Mills College
- Simon Greer (born 1968), American labor and community organizer and social change leader
- Skip Greer, vocalist for the Dead Kennedys
- Sonny Greer (1895–1982), American jazz drummer and vocalist known for his work with Duke Ellington
- Steven M. Greer (born 1955), American physician and ufologist
- Stuart Greer (born 1959), American character actor
- Stubby Greer (1920–1994), player, coach and manager in Minor League Baseball
- Terry Greer (born 1957), professional American and Canadian football player
- Thomas Greer, various including:
  - Thomas Greer (footballer) (1889–1912), Scottish professional footballer
  - Thomas Greer (MP) (1837–1905), Irish Conservative politician
  - Thomas Greer (senator) (1853–1928), unionist politician in Northern Ireland
- Tommy Greer (born 1983), Australian professional basketball player
- Will Greer (born 2003), American politician
- William Greer (1909–1985), agent of the U.S. Secret Service, driver when President John F. Kennedy was assassinated
- William Greer (bishop) (1902–1972), Anglican Bishop
- William C. Greer (died 2001), American politician from Maryland
- Zack Greer (born 1986), Canadian professional lacrosse player

== See also ==
- Greer (disambiguation)
- Greer (given name)
