= Thomas Greer =

Thomas Greer or Tom Greer may refer to:

- Thomas Greer (MP) (1837–1905), Irish Conservative politician
- Thomas Greer (senator) (1853–1928), unionist politician in Northern Ireland
- Thomas Greer (footballer) (born 1889), Scottish professional footballer
