= Greear =

Greear is a surname. Notable people with the surname include:

- Conley E. Greear (1887–1966), American politician from Virginia
- Daniel W. Greear (born 1968), American politician
- J. D. Greear (born 1973), American Southern Baptist minister
- Mike Greear (born 1967), American politician

== See also ==
- Greer (surname)
