= Grier =

Grier is a surname and given name, and may refer to:

== People surnamed Grier ==
- Anfernee Grier, baseball player
- Antonio Grier (born 2000), American football player
- Bobby Grier (Pittsburgh Panthers) (fl. 1950s), American college football player who broke color barrier
- David Grier, musician
- David Alan Grier (born 1955), American actor
- David Alan Grier (writer), American writer on technology and social policy
- Eliza Ann Grier (1864–1902), African-American physician
- Francis Grier (born 1955), British composer
- Hayes Grier, (born 2000), American Vine celebrity
- JA Grier (born 1968), American planetary scientist
- Jane Grier (1856–1902), Irish-German textile artist
- J. D. Grier (1929/30–1998), American religious and civil rights leader and politician
- Mike Grier (born 1975), American hockey player
- Nash Grier (born 1997), American Vine celebrity
- Pam Grier (born 1949), American actor
- Robert Cooper Grier (1794–1870), American jurist
- Rosey Grier (born 1932), American football player
- Ruth Grier (fl. 1980s), Canadian politician
- Terry Grier (1936–2023), Canadian politician
- Vincent Grier (born 1983) basketball player
- Will Grier (born 1995), American football player; older brother of Hayes and Nash

== People named Grier ==
- Grier Hopkins (born 1983), American politician
- Grier Jones (born 1946), American golf coach and professional golfer
- Grier Martin (born 1968), American politician and attorney
- Grier Raggio, American attorney and politician

== See also ==
- Grierson (disambiguation)
- Greer (disambiguation)
