= Greer =

Greer may refer to:

== People ==
- Greer (surname)
- Greer (given name)

== Places ==
=== United States ===
- Greer, Arizona, an unincorporated community and census-designated place
- Greer, Idaho, an unincorporated community
- Greer, Missouri, an unincorporated community
- Greer, Ohio, an unincorporated community
- Greer, South Carolina, a city
- Greer, West Virginia, an unincorporated community
- Greer County, Texas, named for John Alexander Greer
- Greer County, Oklahoma, named for John Alexander Greer
- Greer Township, Warrick County, Indiana

=== Antarctica ===
- Greer Peak, Marie Byrd Land

== Other uses ==
- Greer High School, Greer, South Carolina
- Greer School, a former school for disadvantaged children in Dutchess County, New York
- Greer Industries, a privately held producer of limestone, steel and other products based in Morgantown, West Virginia
- USS Greer (DD-145), an American destroyer commissioned in 1918
- Herschel Greer Stadium, a baseball stadium located in Nashville, Tennessee
- Greer Grant (or Tigra), a superheroine in Marvel Comics
- Carl W. Greer, the first Doc (G.I. Joe), and Carla P. Greer, the second
- "Greer", a track on DC Talk's 1992 album Free at Last

== See also ==
- Greer Depot, Greer, South Carolina, a former railroad depot on the National Register of Historic Places
- Greer Post Office, Greer, South Carolina, on the National Register of Historic Places
- Greer House, a historic home in Rocky Mount, Virginia, on the National Register of Historic Places
- Greer Spring, Missouri
- Grier
