= Greer (given name) =

- Pronunciation: US: /ˈɡrɪr/ UK: /ˈɡrɪə/
- Gender: Unisex
- Language: English

Origin
- Language: Scottish Gaelic
- Origin: From the surname
- Meaning: From a Scottish surname that was derived from the given name Gregor.
- Region of origin: Scotland

Other names
- Variant form: Grier
- Related names: Grierson, Gregor

Greer is a unisex given name of Scottish origin.

Notable people called Greer include:

== Women ==
- Greer Donley, American attorney
- Greer Garson, CBE (1904–1996), British-American actress very popular during the Second World War
- Greer Gilman, American author of fantasy stories
- Greer Goodman, co-writer of 2000 romantic comedy film The Tao of Steve
- Greer Grammer (born 1992), American actress and former beauty queen
- Greer Honeywill (born 1945), Australian conceptual artist
- Greer Lankton (1958–1996), American artist known for creating lifelike, sewn dolls modelled on friends and celebrities
- Greer Robson (born 1971), New Zealand television actress known for a role in the TV drama Shortland Street
- Greer Shephard, American television producer and director
- Greer Stevens (born 1957), retired professional tennis player from South Africa

== Men ==
- Greer Barnes (comedian) (born 1964), American comedian and actor
- Greer Ellis (1920–1997), American engineer and inventor
- Greer Grimsley (born 1956), American bass-baritone opera singer
- Greer Skousen (1916–1988), Mexican basketball player who competed in the 1936 Summer Olympics
- Greer Twiss (born 1937), New Zealand sculptor

== See also ==
- Greer (disambiguation)
- Greer (surname)
