= Herschel Greer Stadium =

Demolished Minor League Baseball park in Nashville, Tennessee, US

Greer Stadium
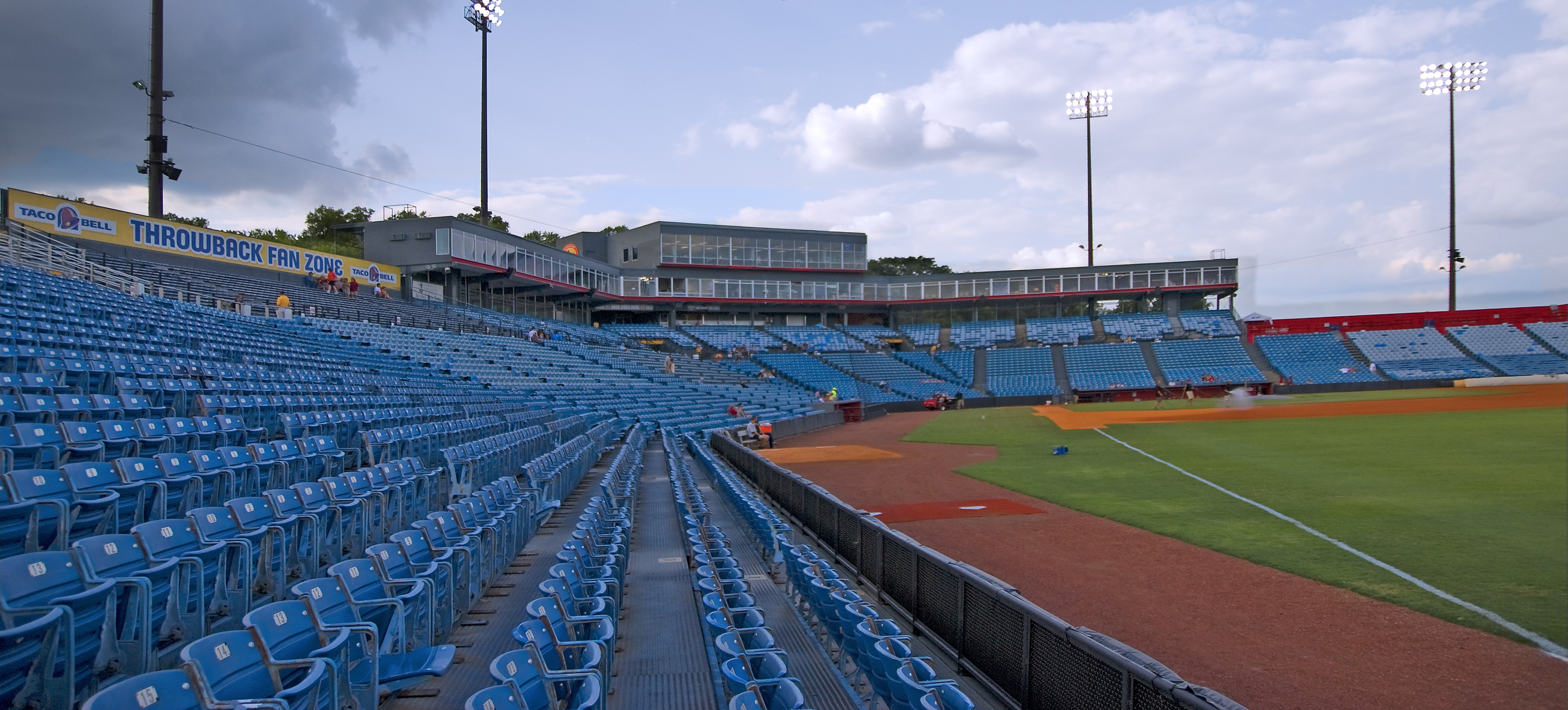
- A view of Greer from the right field seats
- Interactive map of Greer Stadium
- Full name: Herschel Greer Stadium
- Location: 534 Chestnut Street; Nashville, Tennessee; United States
- Coordinates: 36°8′36″N 86°46′25″W
- Owner: Nashville Metro Government
- Capacity: 10,300 (fixed seating); 15,000 (plus standing room)
- Surface: Bermuda grass
- Record attendance: 22,315 (August 18, 1982; Nashville Sounds vs. Columbus Astros)
- Field size: Left field: 327 ft (100 m); Left-center field: 375 ft (114 m); Center field: 400 ft (120 m); Right-center field: 375 ft (114 m); Right field: 327 ft (100 m)
- Acreage: 26.1 acres (10.6 ha)

Construction
- Groundbreaking: August 26, 1977
- Opened: April 26, 1978; 48 years ago
- Closed: August 27, 2014; 12 years ago
- Demolished: 2019
- Cost: $1.5 million ($7.4 million in 2025 dollars)
- Architect: Stoll-Reed Architects
- General contractor: J. B. Regen

Tenants
- Nashville Sounds (SL/AA/PCL) 1978–2014; Belmont Bruins (NAIA/NCAA) 1979–2010; Nashville Xpress (SL) 1993–1994

Herschel Greer Stadium was a Minor League Baseball park in Nashville, Tennessee, United States. Located on the grounds of Fort Negley, an American Civil War fortification, it was approximately two mi (3.2 km) south of the city's downtown district. The facility closed at the end of the 2014 baseball season and remained deserted for over four years until its demolition in 2019. Following an archaeological survey, the land is expected to be reincorporated into Fort Negley Park.

Greer was opened in 1978 for the Nashville Sounds, an expansion franchise of the Double-A Southern League who moved to the Triple-A American Association in 1985 and to the Triple-A Pacific Coast League in 1998. The stadium played host to the team until 2014. The subject of numerous upgrades and repairs to maintain its functionality, Greer became one of the oldest stadiums used by a Triple-A team and had fallen well below professional baseball's standards for a stadium at that class level by the end of its use. For over a decade, the Sounds attempted to secure agreements with the Metropolitan Government of Nashville and Davidson County for a new ballpark to replace Greer, eventually resulting in the construction of First Tennessee Park, which became the Sounds' new home in 2015.

Amidst the Sounds' 37-season run, Greer simultaneously hosted two professional baseball clubs in 1993 and 1994, acting as a temporary home to a displaced Southern League franchise known during that period as the Nashville Xpress. The stadium also saw occasional use as a venue for college baseball, high school football, and charity softball events. It was the site of three minor league all-star games, eight no-hitters, including one perfect game, and a 24-inning game which tied the record for the longest game in Pacific Coast League history. The stadium was best recognized by its distinctive guitar-shaped scoreboard.

== History ==
=== Planning and construction (1976–1978) ===
Larry Schmittou, the leader of an effort to bring professional baseball back to Nashville in the late 1970s, knew he would need to build a new ballpark as the city's previous ballpark, Sulphur Dell, had been demolished in 1969. He learned from a member of the Metro Board of Parks and Recreation that neither the Parks Board nor the city of Nashville would be willing to pay for such a park. So, Schmittou, along with help from country musician Conway Twitty, put together a group of investors including other country artists Cal Smith and Jerry Reed, as well as other Nashvillians, to finance a stadium and a minor league team. The Metro Parks Board agreed to lease to Schmittou a plot of land at the foot of St. Cloud Hill on the grounds of Fort Negley, an American Civil War fortification, approximately two mi (3.2 km) south of downtown, for a period of 20 years as long as he built a stadium with a minimum capacity of 6,500 at a cost of at least US$400,000 within 10 years. The city would also relocate the city-owned softball complex that occupied the site. Schmittou would be responsible for building the stadium, paying the property taxes, and paying the city seven percent of the team's total revenue in the second ten years.

Stoll-Reed Architects advised Schmittou that construction of a suitable stadium would cost between $300,000 and $500,000, but bids for the project ranged from $980,000 to $1.2 million. Schmittou looked to local suppliers to donate construction materials, took out a $30,000 loan from a bank, sold season tickets in advance of having a team, and even mortgaged his own home to help pay for the facility. The actual cost totaled $1.5 million. The stadium was posthumously named for Herschel Lynn Greer, a prominent Nashville businessman and the first president of Vols, Inc., an attempt to keep Nashville's previous minor league baseball team, the Nashville Vols, alive as a fan-owned enterprise, and whose family donated $25,000 for stadium construction.

The home opener for Greer's first tenants, the Southern League's Nashville Sounds, the Double-A affiliate of the Cincinnati Reds, was scheduled for April 25, 1978. Construction was underway, but Schmittou knew the ballpark would not be ready by that date. The team requested to open the season with road games and had to swap a series with the Chattanooga Lookouts in order to have more time to complete the stadium. Even with this extra time, the ballpark was still behind schedule. Much of the sod that been laid that winter died. By the time the replacement grass had arrived, the crew hired to lay the sod had left. General Manager Farrell Owens organized a volunteer crew to lay the sod by calling a local radio station to announce the team was having a "sod party". A group of approximately 50 people came out to lay and roll the sod the day before the scheduled opening game.

=== Opening season (1978) ===
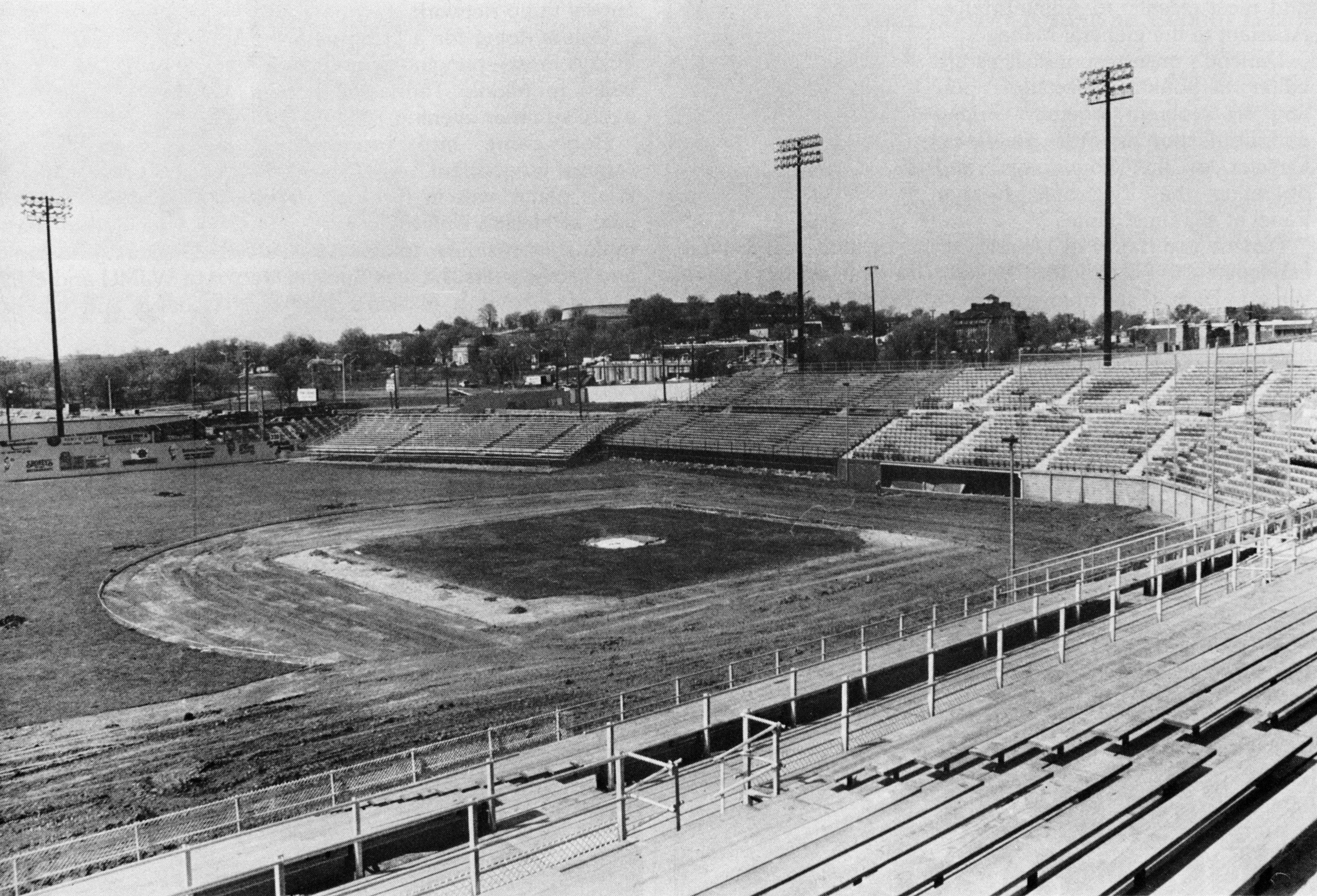
Construction nears an end in April 1978

The scheduled April 25 Greer home opener was rained out and pushed back to the evening of April 26. After playing their first ten games away from home, and with tractors and grading machines still preparing the field on game day, the Sounds played their first home game on April 26, 1978. The 12–4 victory against the Savannah Braves was witnessed by a sellout crowd of 8,156 spectators. Southern League president Billy Hitchcock was on hand to witness the event, and Conway Twitty threw out the first pitch. On the field, Sounds catcher Joe Griffin led the 16-hit Nashville offense with 4 hits and 5 runs batted in (RBI) while starting pitcher Bruce Berenyi got the win and closer Doug Corbett earned a save.

Though the stadium was opened on time, the late sod was not the only issue on Opening Day. The electricity was turned on only five minutes before the gates opened. Only two women's restrooms and one men's restroom were functioning, though a few portable toilets were also available. The stadium's seats, which had previously been used in Atlanta's Fulton County Stadium, arrived just in time for installation. Construction of the backstop was still being completed on Opening Day. Players for both the Sounds and the visiting Braves had concerns about the safety of playing on the quickly installed infield, initially refusing to play on the surface. Left fielders complained about the extra-steep slope in left field that prevented them from seeing home plate. The outfield grass was taken up and the soil regraded to alleviate this problem while the Sounds were away on an eight-day road trip.

Initially, Greer was capable of seating 7,200 spectators, but was expanded to 8,800 by the end of the inaugural season. Theater-type seats with back support and armrests accounted for 3,000 of the stadium's seats; bleacher seats made up the remainder. The press box included two radio broadcast booths and an organ booth. There were locker rooms for two teams, which each accommodated 25 people, as well as a locker room for umpires. The field measured 330 feet (100 m) down the left and right field lines, 375 feet (114 m) to left- and right-center fields, and 405 feet (123 m) to center field. The home team occupied the third base dugout, and visitors occupied the first base dugout, with each team's bullpen located in foul territory in the outfield corners. Eight lighting grids atop steel poles 100 feet (30 m) high provided illumination for night games. Amenities for customers at the park included two men's and women's restrooms and seven concession stands.

=== Expansion (1979–1989) ===
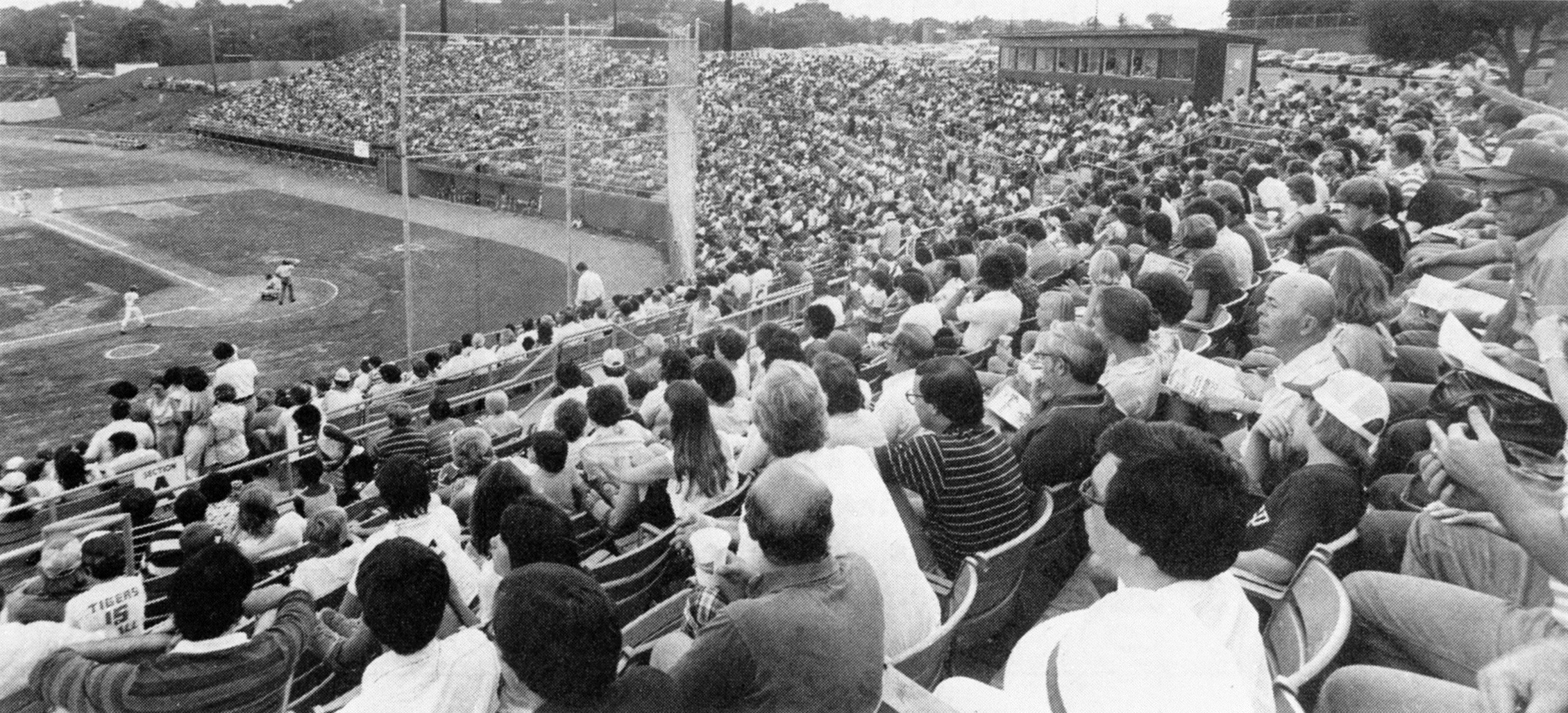
High attendance in the inaugural 1978 season led to expansion in the ensuing years.

With the addition of 5,000 permanent seats, Greer's seating capacity was increased to 13,000 for the 1979 season. Improvements to the playing field included new irrigation and drainage systems which raised the field 5 feet (1.5 m) above its previous elevation. Nashville set the Southern League season attendance record in 1980 when a total of 575,676 fans attended games at the facility.

Prior to the 1981 season, Greer underwent a number of renovations including the addition of over 1,200 box seats and over 1,000 new general admission seats. Two wooden general admission seating areas were replaced by 2,000 contoured seats. The original backstop, which consisted of several steel poles, was upgraded to a steel cable system, eliminating most of the poles. Other stadium upgrades included two new dugouts, three entrance and exit ramps, a new sound system, doubling the size of the reader panel on the scoreboard, and enlarging the ticket booth. The ballpark's all-time attendance record, also a team and Southern League record, was set on August 18, 1982, when 22,315 people watched the Sounds defeat the Columbus Astros, 3–0. Portions of the outfield had to be roped off to accommodate the crowd, which was far in excess of Greer's seating capacity.

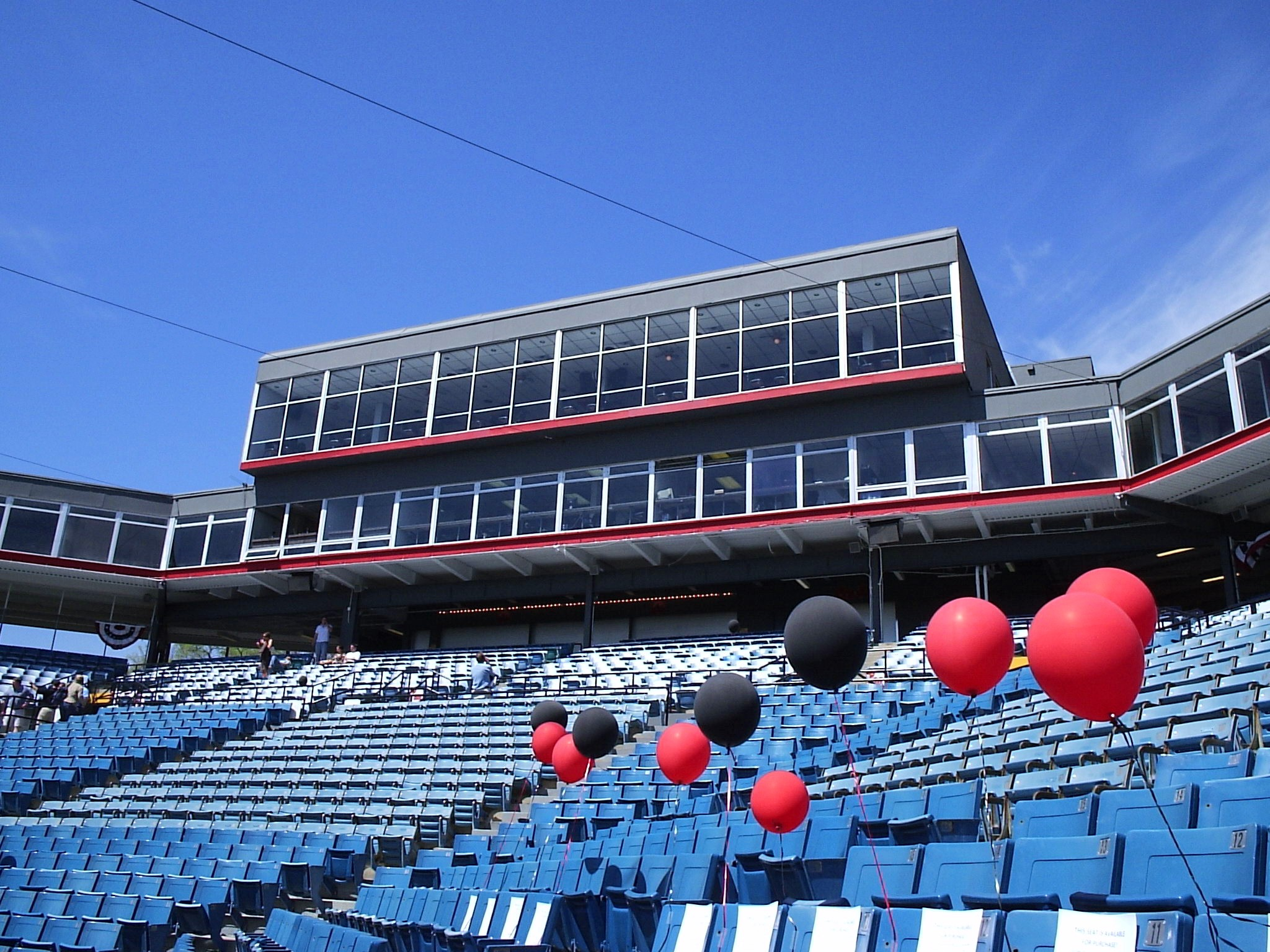
A new press box, restaurant, and sky boxes were built in 1984.

From February through mid-summer 1984, major renovations and additions were made to the facility. A full-service restaurant, The Hall of Fame Stadium Club, and a mini-roof, to cover the last five rows of the reserved seating section and the main concourse, were built. A new press box included accommodations for additional members of the media, two separate booths for home and visiting radio broadcasts, and two separate booths for home and visiting television broadcasts. Ten sky boxes were built adjacent the press box; by 1989, the number of sky boxes had increased to 18.

In July 1984, Schmittou purchased the Triple-A Evansville Triplets of the American Association. The team moved from Evansville to Nashville for the 1985 season, upon which the Triplets' legacy was retired and the franchise adopted the Sounds' name and history, effectively elevating the organization from Double-A to Triple-A. The Double-A Southern League franchise was moved to Huntsville, Alabama, where the team began play as the Huntsville Stars at the hastily constructed Joe W. Davis Stadium.

To prepare for the move to Triple-A, renovations continued prior to the 1985 season with the addition of 1,200 box seats, which replaced some of the reserved grandstand seating, as well as more seating past the right field foul pole. A 4-line scoreboard 10 feet (3.0 m) high replaced the stadium's original, which was relocated to far left field to serve as an out-of-town scoreboard, providing scores for American League, National League, and other American Association baseball games.

Schmittou's desire to land a Triple-A team was part of a larger plan to put Nashville in a position to contend for a Major League Baseball franchise in the future. Along with this goal, the need for more seating, and a desire to make Greer a more attractive ballpark, significant renovations began after the 1987 season. The number of box seats was increased by 40 percent, the clubhouse and umpire facilities were upgraded, and the dugouts were entirely rebuilt. The new dugouts took up slightly more room than the previous ones, resulting in a minor contraction of the field's dimensions: 327 feet (100 m) down the left and right field lines, 371 feet (113 m) to left and right-center fields, and 400 feet (120 m) to center field. The main concourse entrance was redesigned to incorporate the stonemasonry of the adjacent Fort Negley. This expansion brought Greer's total seating capacity up to 18,000.

=== Renovations and reductions (1990–1999) ===
In 1990, Major League Baseball (MLB) team owners met to demand that minor league owners improve their ballparks in order to meet their desired standards. Greer had already fallen behind other parks when it came to the quality of the field and clubhouse, and it also lacked a weight room and batting cages. Following a failed bid to secure an MLB team for Nashville in the 1993 expansion process (Nashville was one of ten cities considered, but was eliminated from contention very early in the process; the two new franchises were eventually awarded to Denver and Miami), Schmittou focused on scaling-back his proposed MLB stadium into a new Triple-A facility for the Sounds. At a time when other Triple-A cities were building new, relatively luxurious ballparks, Schmittou was unable to convince Mayor Phil Bredesen or the Metro Council to pay for such a new park. He considered moving the team to a surrounding county, and explored sites in La Vergne, Cool Springs, and Mount Juliet. He even tried, unsuccessfully, to get the Metro Council to pass a referendum to let taxpayers vote on a temporary tax increase to pay off a proposed $40-million stadium in three years. In the end, Schmittou elected to keep the Sounds at Greer but make significant improvements to the stadium.

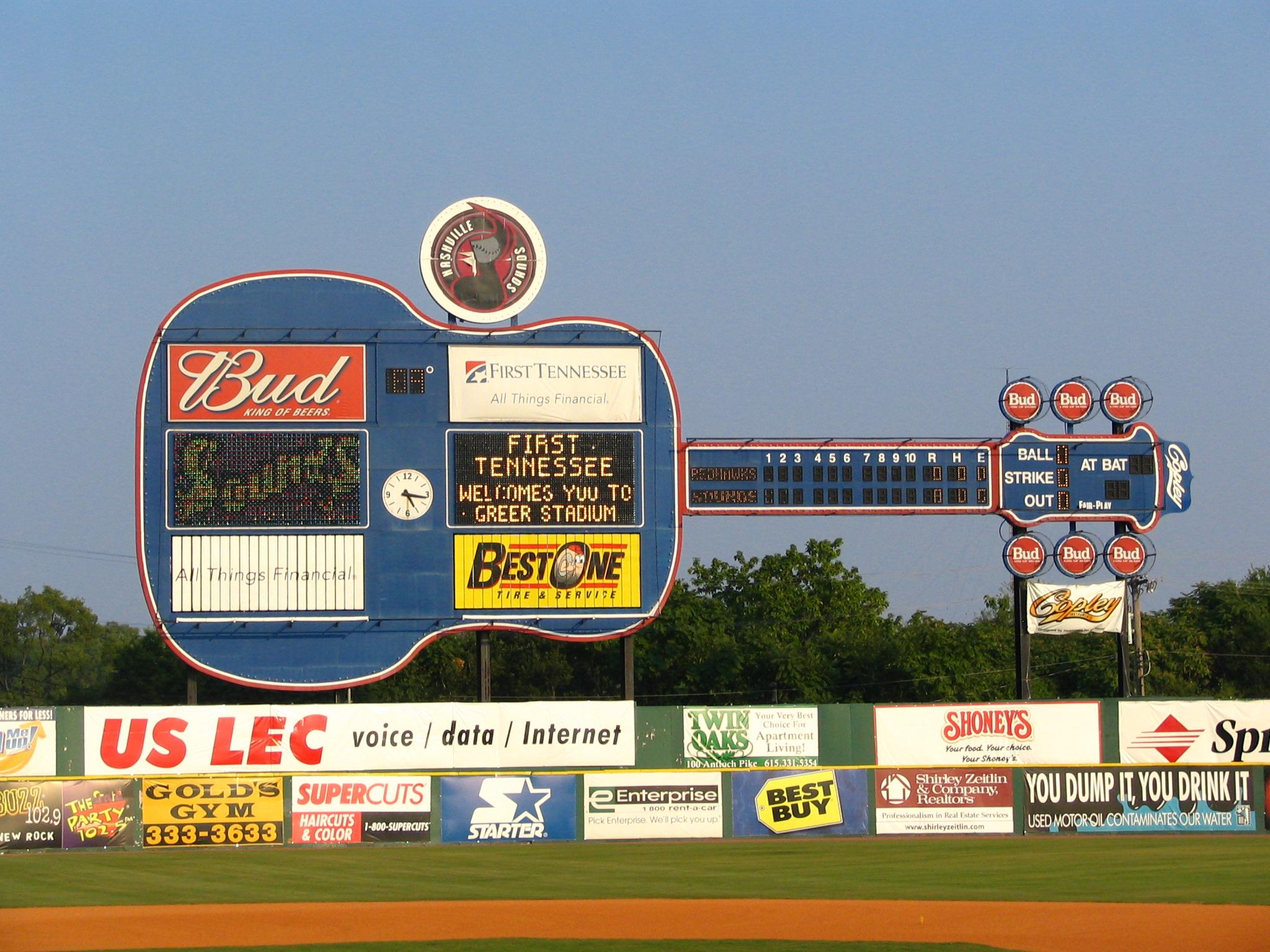
Greer's guitar scoreboard, in its original color scheme, was installed in 1993.

Greer's distinctive guitar-shaped scoreboard, made by the Fair-Play company, was installed behind the left-center field wall prior to the 1993 season. Another addition in 1993 was that of a second team to play at Greer. From 1993 to 1994, the ballpark simultaneously served as the home field for the Sounds and the Nashville Xpress, the Double-A Southern League affiliate of the Minnesota Twins. This came about when Charlotte, North Carolina, acquired a Triple-A expansion franchise in 1993, leaving the city's Double-A team, the Charlotte Knights, without a home. Schmittou offered Greer Stadium as a temporary home for the team. In order to accommodate another club at Greer, the Xpress' home games were scheduled for during the Sounds' road trips.

The Xpress played their first home game at Greer on April 16, 1993, against the Orlando Cubs. Pitchers Todd Ritchie, Mike Misuraca, and Jason Klonoski limited Cubs hitters to five hits and no runs in the 4–0 shutout. Nashville scored the winning run in the second inning when Brian Raabe doubled bringing home David Rivera and Rich Becker. The game was attended by 1,715 people on a cold night. In April 1994, Michael Jordan's foray into professional baseball attracted 16,842 fans to Greer to see the Xpress face his team, the Birmingham Barons, for the first time that season. The Nashville Xpress played their last home game on September 1, 1994, against the Huntsville Stars. With Nashville holding a 1–0 lead going into the eighth inning, Huntsville scored three runs in both the eighth and ninth innings on the way to a 6–2 defeat of the home team. In 1995, the Xpress relocated to Wilmington, North Carolina, and became the Port City Roosters.

Over $200,000 was spent on renovations in the fall and winter before the 1995 season. The home clubhouse and weight room were remodeled, aisles behind the dugouts were resurfaced to reduce slippery areas, and the entire playing field was re-sodded. This was the first replacement and upgrading of the field since the original sod was laid in 1978. First, all of the old grass was stripped from the field. Then, the grounds crew installed a new drainage system. Four trenches were dug and laid with 2,500 feet (760 m) of drainage pipe to carry water away from the field and beyond the center field wall. A layer of gravel was laid over the pipe, and a 4-to-6-inch (10 to 15 cm) layer of sand was placed above the gravel. After raising the level of the infield dirt and brick warning track to the same height of the new field, 100,000 square feet (9,300 square metres) of Tifton 419 Bermuda Grass was installed on the field and edged into a baseball diamond configuration.

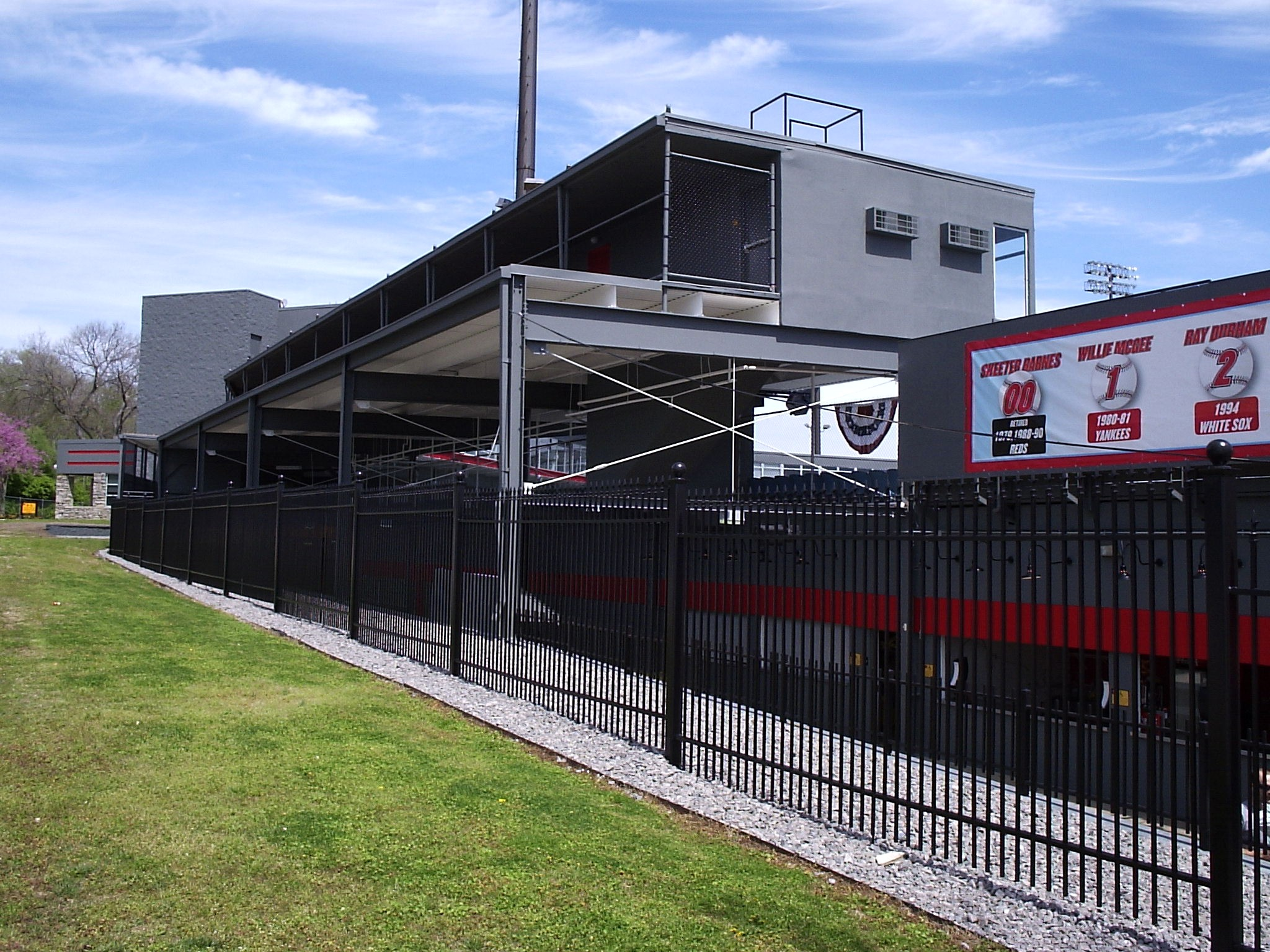
The first base concourse viewed from outside the park

With Greer Stadium still falling below Triple-A standards, Schmittou proposed dropping the Sounds back to Double-A in 1996 via a trade with the Southern League's Memphis Chicks. The Chicago White Sox, the Sounds' major league affiliate, did not see Memphis' Tim McCarver Stadium as an improvement over Greer and convinced Schmittou to delay the swap by at least a year. Schmittou instead made $400,000 worth of renovations before the 1996 season to keep it a viable location for a Triple-A team through 1997. These improvements included a new visitors' clubhouse, new seats, and a security fence surrounding the entire ballpark.

The 1996 season marked the last that Schmittou was the team's president and part majority owner. With the city prepared to welcome a National Football League franchise, which was to become the Tennessee Titans, Schmittou felt that revenue would be drawn away from his baseball team, so he and businessman Walter Nipper sold their 59 percent stake in the Sounds to Chicago-based businessmen Al Gordon, Mike Murtaugh, and Mike Woleben. The new ownership group, operating as AmeriSports Companies LLC, refurbished every area of the stadium, including the concession stands, bathrooms, concourse, stadium exterior, home clubhouse (a visitor's clubhouse had been built under the third base bleachers for the 1996 season), and parking lots. Several sections of bleachers in left field past third base were removed and replaced by tents and a group picnic area. This reduced the seating capacity to 11,500.

Following the 1997 season, the American Association was dissolved, and the Sounds became members of the Pacific Coast League (PCL). As a result, Greer became the second easternmost stadium in PCL history behind the Indianapolis Indians' Bush Stadium when that team played in the PCL from 1964 to 1968. Greer was the easternmost active PCL stadium from 1998 to 2014.

As consumer preferences changed and in an effort to attract larger groups to the ballpark, in the late 1990s, Greer Stadium's fixed-seating capacity was reduced to 10,300 by eliminating the bleacher sections from the third base side and right field and constructing three party decks in their places. As a result, the general admission area became confined only to the existing bleachers behind the reserved seating along the first base line in right field. A fourth party area was created by repurposing unused space atop the grandstands behind home plate. Another deck was built behind the right-field foul pole, which, at times, featured a rentable hot tub.

=== Nearing the end (2000–2009) ===
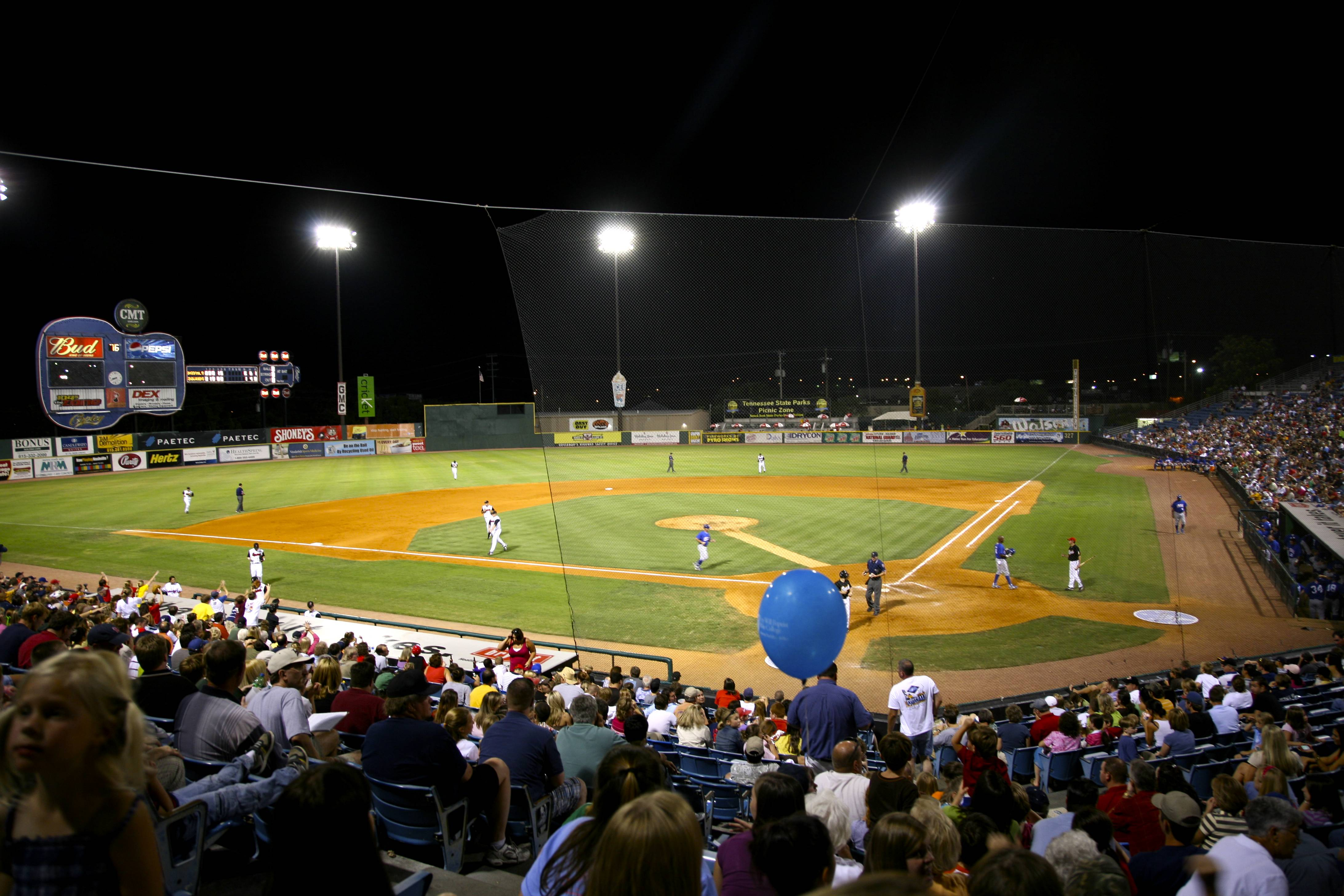
A 2008 game at Greer with the newly built clubhouse visible beyond center field

The aging Greer Stadium had never been meant to last longer than 30 years, and it was the subject of many renovations in the early 2000s to attempt to come close to meeting minimum Triple-A standards. In 2003, the Sounds proposed a new stadium to be built with a mix of public and private funds at the corner of 1st Avenue South and Gateway Boulevard (now Korean Veterans Boulevard) in Downtown Nashville on the former site of the city's thermal transfer energy plant, targeting an opening date in April 2006. After two years of the Sounds lobbying for the new park and threatening to leave town (either for the suburbs or a new city altogether), Mayor Bill Purcell agreed to support preliminary plans for the stadium on October 25, 2005, and the Nashville Metro Council approved the new stadium on February 7, 2006, due in part to the Sounds securing construction financing through a consortium of banks, avoiding taxpayer expense. The facility was to be called First Tennessee Field. Opening day at the proposed venue was repeatedly pushed back, eventually to as late as April 2009. However, the Sounds and private developers Struever Brothers, Eccles, & Rouse were unable to finalize financing and design plans for the new stadium by the April 15, 2007, deadline set by the Metro Council. As a result, the First Tennessee Field construction project was canceled and the Sounds remained at Greer with an uncertain future.

Following the dissolution of the plans for the new ballpark, and prior to the 2008 season, more than $1 million in upgrades and repairs were made to Greer. The improvements, which included a new clubhouse for the Sounds and visiting teams beyond the center field wall, improved field lighting, and improvements to restrooms, walkways, and seating, were made in order to keep the stadium functional for another three to five years.

After the 2008 season, Al Gordon's Amerisports Companies LLC sold the Sounds to MFP Baseball, a New York-based group of investors consisting of Masahiro Honzawa, Steve Posner, and Frank Ward. Keeping the team in Nashville was one of the PCL's top criteria for approval of the sale. The new ownership group invested over $2 million to make repairs and upgrades to the aging stadium's playing field, restrooms, concession stands, scoreboard, sound system, and seating. The infield was re-sodded and leveled, protective railing was installed along the edge of the field, and the backstop netting was replaced. The entire concourse and guitar scoreboard were repainted, broken seats were replaced, and the fourth-floor restaurant was remodeled. A permanent concert stage and a family fun zone were constructed by the concourse entrance.

=== The "Last Cheer at Greer" (2010–2014) ===
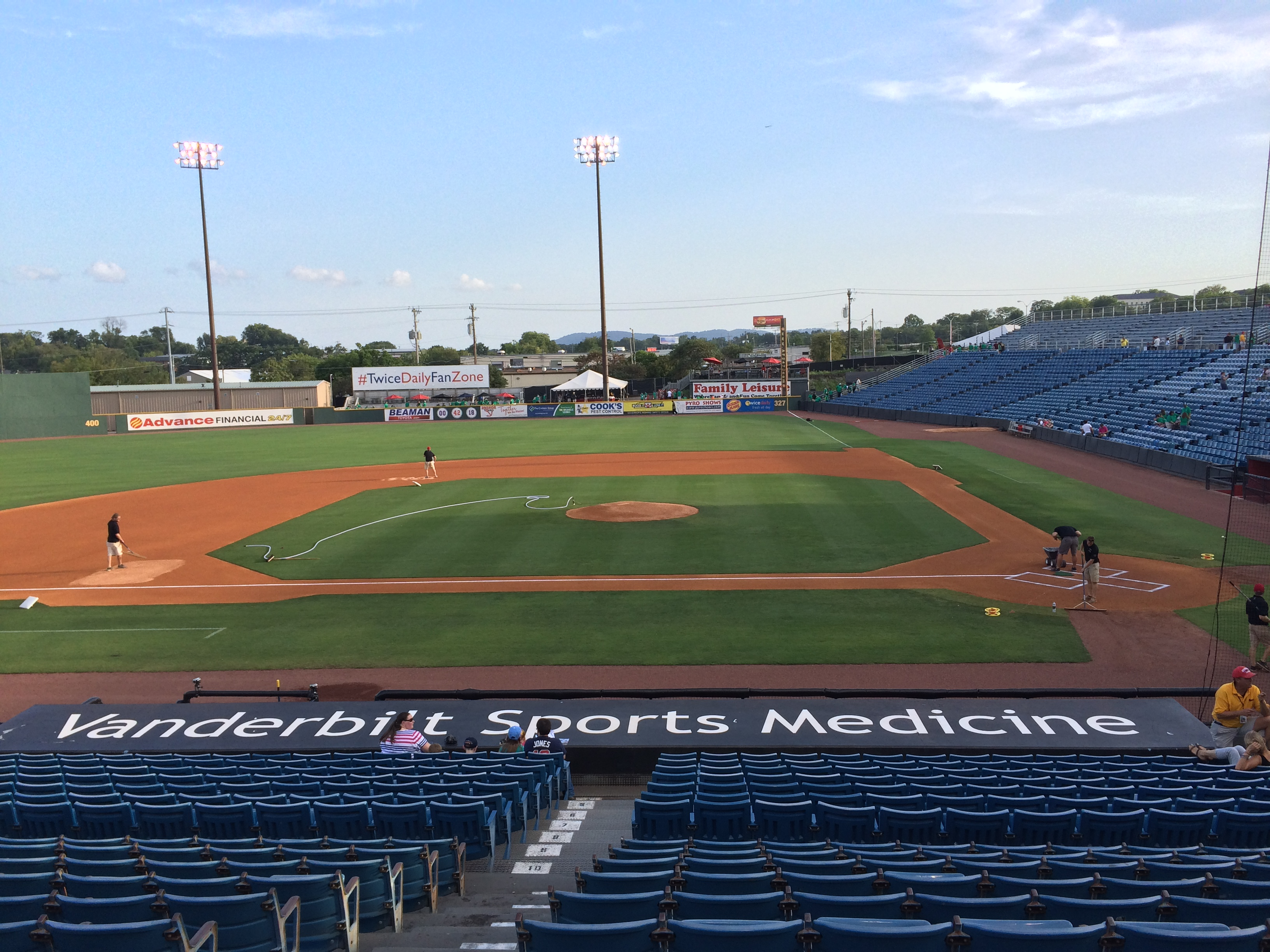
The grounds crew preparing the infield before a game in Greer's final season

In 2011, MFP Baseball and the Mayor's Office began working toward a new stadium, with the city identifying three potential sites for construction, and recruiting stadium-builder Populous to study each. The three sites were an area on the north end of The Gulch, the state-owned parking lot on the site of Nashville's first ballpark (Sulphur Dell), and various areas directly adjacent to Nissan Stadium and the eastern terminus of the John Seigenthaler Pedestrian Bridge. The Sounds still preferred the previous Thermal site due to its proximity to the city's entertainment and central business districts, but the city was not willing to make a second attempt at a stadium in that location (Ascend Amphitheater was eventually built there). Mayor Karl Dean preferred the Sulphur Dell site, in an attempt to bolster economic growth on downtown's sluggish north side, while incorporating the ballpark into the surrounding neighborhoods. In late summer 2013, the Sounds and the Nashville Metropolitan Government reached an agreement to build a new $37-million downtown ballpark at Sulphur Dell. Construction on First Tennessee Park began after necessary land-swaps with the State of Tennessee, and the new ballpark opened in time for the start of the 2015 season.

Knowing that the 2014 season would be the team's 37th and final campaign at the old ballpark, the Sounds launched the "Last Cheer at Greer", a season-long celebration of the stadium that included nods to its history and promotional giveaways to commemorate the closing. On August 27, 2014, the Sounds hosted their final game at Greer Stadium: an 8–5 loss to the Sacramento River Cats. In his only plate appearance of the evening, Nashville catcher Lucas May struck out swinging with a full count and the bases loaded to end the game. Announced attendance at the game was a standing-room-only crowd of 11,067, the first sellout since 2010, and the largest crowd since 2007.

=== Closure and demolition (2015–2019) ===
After the Sounds' administrative offices were moved to First Tennessee Park in early 2015, Greer became essentially abandoned. Vandals peppered the site with graffiti, and many of the building's windows and box seats were damaged. The playing field became overgrown with brush, and photos of the stadium's interior began appearing on the websites and social media accounts of anonymous urban explorers.

Later that year, Mayor Dean expressed interest in converting the facility to a community sporting complex or a new city park, but, nearing the end of his term, ultimately deferred the decision to the next mayor (Megan Barry, elected 2015). In the meantime, Metropolitan Director of Parks Tommy Lynch recommended that the stadium be demolished due to the potential costs for any renovation, including the removal of asbestos. The department asked Mayor Barry for $800,000 to fund the demolition of the concourse and seating bowl so as to expand the green space at the property, which could then be sold to private developers.

Proposed uses for the land included a soccer stadium, an indoor tennis facility for Belmont University, public tennis courts, rodeo grounds, a Kroger grocery store, and a neighborhood park. In a letter to the editor of The Tennessean, former Sounds President Larry Schmittou expressed his interest in Greer becoming an amateur baseball park, citing its amenities and several Metro high schools that lacked baseball diamonds of their own. Two public meetings were held in September 2016 to discuss these and other proposals and ideas for the space.

The city's goal was to create a mixed-use development with green space and affordable housing. By April 2017, a special committee had narrowed the search for a plan and site developer down to five proposals. In May 2017, the Barry administration selected a proposal called Cloud Hill by the Nashville-based Mathews Company and backed by music producer T Bone Burnett. The proposed redevelopment of the 21-acre site included music and art space, a community center, open park space, and affordable housing. The footprint of the baseball diamond and outfield would have been turned into the Great Lawn, a 4.2-acre (1.7 ha) green space for amateur baseball and soccer. Renderings showed the guitar scoreboard and a portion of the outfield wall remaining intact. The plan, which awaited final approval by Metro Parks and the Metro Council, was met with concerns by citizens and groups whom preferred to see the property restored entirely to parkland and the site's Civil War history preserved. Other concerns were raised over the lack of transparency in the city's planning process and the privatization of publicly owned land. Cloud Hill's developers canceled their plans in January 2018 after archaeologists determined that undisturbed areas on the edge of the Greer property, but not part of the stadium itself, were the unmarked burial sites of slaves forced to build Fort Negley. Mayor Barry expressed her desire that the site honor the history of those who died building the fort.

Following Barry's resignation in March 2018, acting Mayor David Briley proposed the demolition of Greer Stadium and the reincorporation of the land into Fort Negley Park. He sought Metro Council approval for the approximately $1 million needed to demolish the stadium, the site of which would then be seeded over with grass. The Metro Historical Commission was tasked with determining a plan to convert the site into one which would honor its Civil War history. Demolition began on April 1, 2019, and was expected to take six months to complete. This was followed by an archaeological survey of the site. As of July 2022, the Metro Parks Department and Metro Historical Commission were planning an open-air museum that shows how the stadium site fits into the history of Fort Negley.

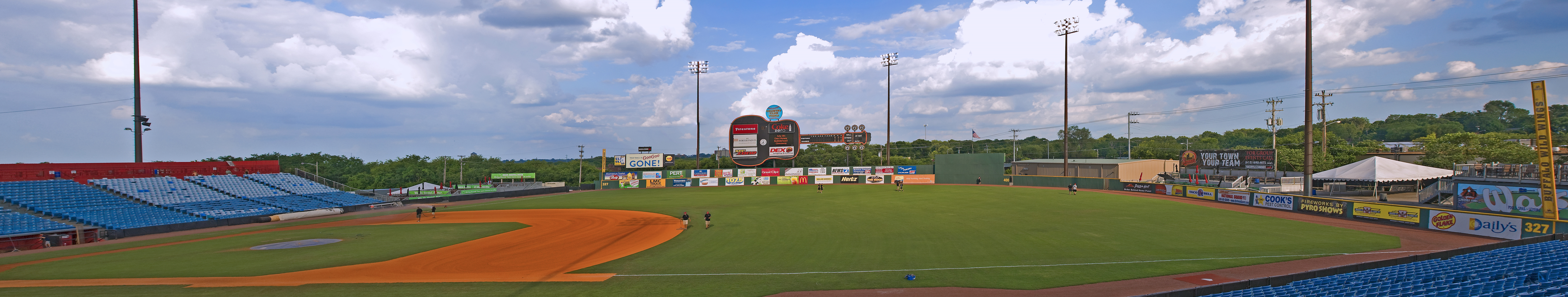
A panorama of Greer in 2011

== Notable events ==
=== All-Star Games ===
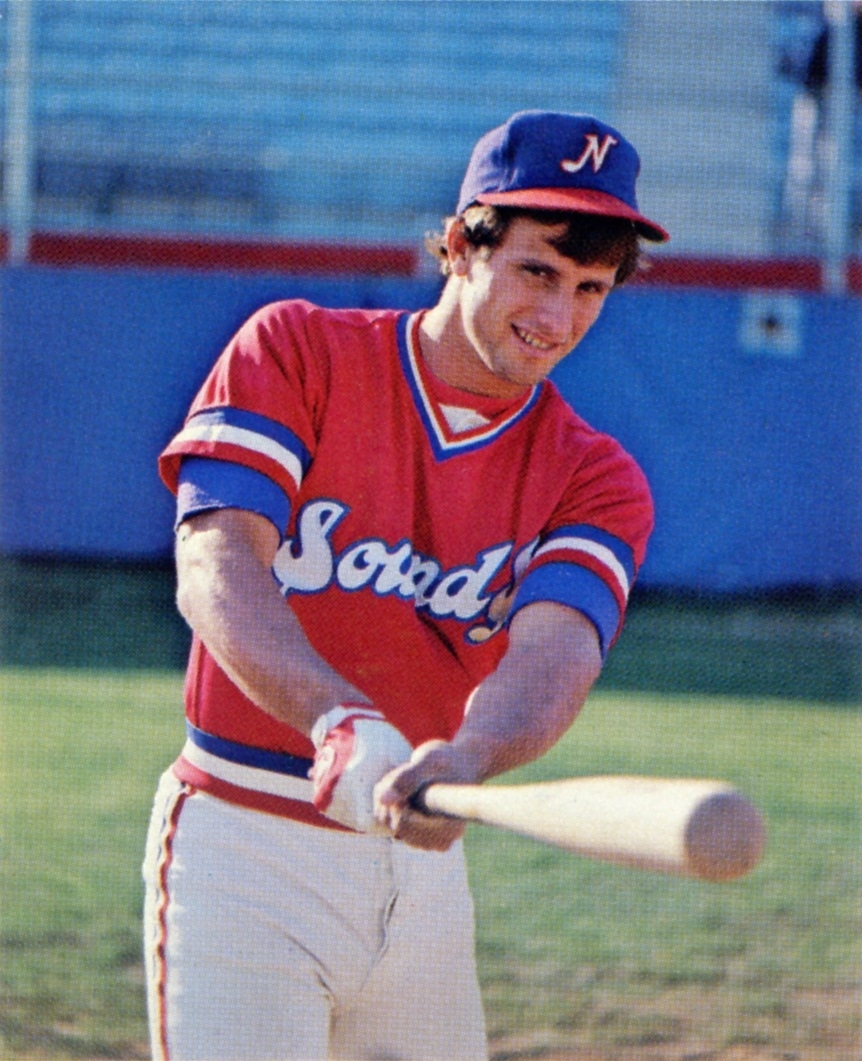
Sounds outfielder Duane Walker was selected as the MVP of the 1979 Southern League All-Star Game at Greer.

The Southern League All-Star Game was held twice at Greer Stadium, first in 1979 and again in 1983. The July 12, 1979, contest pitted a team of the league's All-Stars against the major league Atlanta Braves. In the third inning, Braves pitcher Preston Hanna was taken deep for a home run by Columbus outfielder Danny Heep, and Nashville's Duane Walker added a run with his RBI single, scoring Memphis second baseman Tim Raines from third. Up 2–0, the All-Stars never trailed. They went on to defeat the Braves, 5–2, before a crowd of 11,079 fans. Charlotte pitcher Larry Jones was the winning pitcher. Walker, who in addition to his run-scoring base hit, also drew a walk, stole two bases, and initiated a double play from center field by snagging a low line drive and throwing out a runner at home plate, was selected as the game's Most Valuable Player (MVP). Nashville was further represented on the All-Star squad by Geoff Combe, Paul Householder, Dave Van Gorder, and manager George Scherger who coached the team.

The midseason exhibition returned to Nashville on June 19, 1983. This time, the Sounds were enlisted to serve as the All-Stars' competition. Consequently, no Sounds player could be voted on to All-Star team. In lieu of this, the league chose to recognize all Sounds players as All-Stars. MLB Commissioner Bowie Kuhn was on hand to toss out the first pitch before an audience of 1,221 who had waited out nearly an hour's rain delay. The All-Stars scored three runs in the sixth inning, including a two-run homer by Birmingham's George Foussianes, the game's eventual MVP. After rallying back with two runs on Scott Bradley's dual RBI single in the eighth, Nashville's Erik Peterson stuck out in the ninth with the tying and winning runs on base to end the game. The league's team had bested Nashville, 3–2. Jacksonville's Mark Gubicza earned the win.

Greer played host to the Triple-A All-Star Game on July 13, 1994, with a crowd of 11,601 on hand in addition to live television and radio audiences. Players from all three Triple-A leagues (the American Association, Pacific Coast League, and International League) were divided into two teams, American and National, based on their MLB parent club's affiliation. Despite an early American League lead, the Nationals came back to score the winning run in the fifth inning when Tucson's Brian Hunter came home on a wild pitch. The Nationals won by a final score of 8–5. The "Star of Stars", or MVP, for the American Association was Nashville's Ray Durham who had three hits and scored the game's first run. Luis Lopez of the Richmond Braves was the International League's MVP for his three-hit, two-RBI night; Paul Faries, of the Phoenix Firebirds, was the PCL's MVP with one hit and two RBIs.

Other 1994 All-Star festivities included a Hollywood All-Star Game featuring celebrities Fred Willard, Jason Bateman, Barry Bostwick, Treat Williams, and Kristoff St. John. There was also a Home Run Derby with four of Triple-A's top home run hitters: Scott Coolbaugh of the Louisville Redbirds, Rich Aude of the Buffalo Bisons, Dwayne Hosey of the Omaha Royals, and Drew Denson of the Sounds. Each batter being given ten swings each to hit as many home runs as possible, Coolbaugh and Denson advanced to the finals with two homers apiece. In the final round, Coolbaugh won the derby by hitting six home runs versus Denson's two.

=== Major league exhibitions ===
Greer hosted 19 exhibition games involving Major League Baseball teams in the 1980s and 1990s. Six were competitions between the Nashville Sounds and their MLB parent clubs, while the other 13 were spring training games between major league teams.

The first such game occurred on April 16, 1981, when the New York Yankees made a stop in Nashville to play an exhibition game against their Double-A Sounds. The 10–1 Yankees victory was played in front of a standing-room-only crowd of 17,318 people. Those on hand for the game included Yankees owner George Steinbrenner, coach Yogi Berra, and players Reggie Jackson, Dave Winfield, Lou Piniella, Willie Randolph, and Bobby Murcer. The Yankees returned for another exhibition game against the Sounds on April 28, 1983. New York had a 4–0 lead going into the bottom of the ninth inning, but a five-run rally with two outs propelled the Sounds to a 5–4 win in front of 13,641 fans. The tying and winning runs came off the bat of catcher Frank Kneuer who doubled down the left field line bringing home Matt Gallegos and Derwin McNealy from second and first. Among the Yankees in attendance for the game were owner George Steinbrenner, manager Billy Martin, coach Yogi Berra, and players Goose Gossage, Ken Griffey Sr., Dave Winfield, Willie Randolph, Bobby Murcer, and former Sound Don Mattingly.

On April 12, 1985, Nashville competed in an exhibition game against their major league affiliate, the Detroit Tigers. Manager Sparky Anderson's Detroit club included Kirk Gibson, Alan Trammell, Lou Whitaker, Rusty Kuntz, and Larry Herndon. The Sounds opened the game with back-to-back base hits and went ahead 2–0 on Mike Laga's RBI double. The game was tied 3–3 after five innings, but the Tigers outlasted the Sounds, scoring six runs in the tenth to win, 9–3, before a crowd of 16,182. On April 23, 1990, 14,012 fans attended an exhibition game at Greer between Nashville and their new affiliate, the Cincinnati Reds. Lou Piniella's Cincinnati squad shutout Nashville, 3–0. Luis Quiñones scored the winning run in the first when he came home on a misplayed ball hit on the ground by Paul O'Neill. Pitchers Danny Jackson and Ron Robinson held the Sounds to just five hits, three by Terry McGriff and two by Keith Lockhart.

Cincinnati returned for a second exhibition with Nashville on April 29, 1991. With light rain falling throughout the evening, the game was called after seven innings when the field become unplayable. Though 13 of the 16 Reds appearing in the game were 1990 World Series champions, including Barry Larkin, Chris Sabo, Paul O'Neill, and Randy Myers, the Sounds limited the visitors to just 5 hits and 2 runs while scoring a pair of runs of their own to make the score 2–2 when the game was ended. Rain also hindered an April 3, 1994, game between the Sounds and Chicago White Sox that was cancelled due to wet grounds and the fear of player injury, especially to top White Sox stars Tim Raines and Ozzie Guillén who were slotted to play.

In March 1996, Greer hosted eight major league teams competing in seven games across the span of four days in what was billed as the Nashville Baseball Classic. The Chicago White Sox, Cincinnati Reds, Cleveland Indians, Detroit Tigers, Kansas City Royals, Montreal Expos, St. Louis Cardinals, and Texas Rangers all visited Nashville as they prepared for the 1996 season. The Sounds played an exhibition game against the Pittsburgh Pirates on June 3, 1999, attended by 5,720 fans. The teams combined for 33 hits, including 9 home runs, in a game dominated by offence. The Pirates, whose roster included Jason Kendall, Emil Brown, and Dale Sveum, plated 13 runs in the fifth inning on the way to 16–15 win.

Major League Baseball exhibition games
Date	Winning team	Score	Losing team	Attendance	Ref.
April 16, 1981	New York Yankees	10–1	Nashville Sounds	17,318	
April 3, 1983	Toronto Blue Jays	7–6	St. Louis Cardinals	13,742	
April 28, 1983	Nashville Sounds	5–4	New York Yankees	13,641	
April 12, 1985	Detroit Tigers	9–3 (10)	Nashville Sounds	16,182	
April 4, 1987	Cincinnati Reds; Montreal Expos	8–8 (11)	—	12,087	
April 5, 1987	Cincinnati Reds	5–3	Montreal Expos	11,218	
April 2, 1988	Cleveland Indians	8–6	Chicago White Sox	10,271	
April 3, 1988	Cleveland Indians	3–2	Pittsburgh Pirates	7,628	
April 23, 1990	Cincinnati Reds	3–0	Nashville Sounds	14,012	
April 6, 1991	Cincinnati Reds	4–3 (10)	Cleveland Indians	17,109	
April 29, 1991	Cincinnati Reds; Nashville Sounds	2–2 (7)	—	—	
March 28, 1996	Chicago White Sox	4–3	Texas Rangers	2,223	
March 28, 1996	Cleveland Indians	9–3	St. Louis Cardinals	—	
March 29, 1996	Chicago White Sox	9–5	Montreal Expos	—	
March 29, 1996	Detroit Tigers	7–4	Cincinnati Reds	—	
March 30, 1996	Detroit Tigers	4–2	Montreal Expos	—	
March 30, 1996	Cincinnati Reds; Kansas City Royals	2–2 (10)	—	—	
March 31, 1996	Kansas City Royals	3–1 (6)	Montreal Expos	—	
June 3, 1999	Pittsburgh Pirates	16–15	Nashville Sounds	5,720	

=== No-hitters and perfect games ===
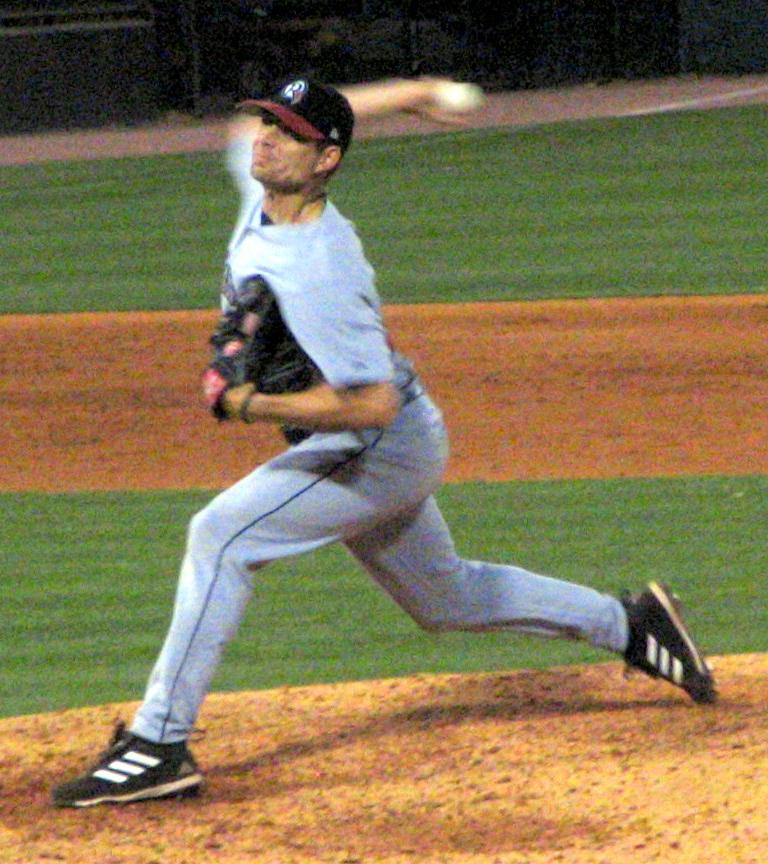
John Wasdin pitched a perfect game at Greer in 2003.

Greer Stadium was the setting for eight no-hit games, including one perfect game. The first took place on May 16, 1981, when Jeff Cornell, of the visiting Jacksonville Suns, pitched a 4–0 no-hit game against the Sounds. The second no-hitter at Greer was Jim Deshaies' 5–1 win over the Columbus Astros on May 4, 1984. In the second inning, Deshaies walked two batters and hit another, loading the bases for Ty Gainey, who hit into a fielder's choice that allowed Mark Strucher to score the Astros' only run of the game, the second part of a seven-inning doubleheader. The third, a 6–0 win over the Oklahoma City 89ers, was thrown by Nashville's Bryan Kelly on July 17, 1985. Kelly allowed just one baserunner via a walk in the near-perfect game.

In a rare occurrence, the Sounds and the Indianapolis Indians exchanged no-hitters on back-to-back nights on August 6 and 7, 1988. First, Indianapolis' Randy Johnson and Pat Pacillo combined for a no-hit loss against the Sounds, a 1–0 Nashville win. Nashville won when Lenny Harris walked to first base, stole second base and third base, and then came home, scoring on a groundout. The next night, Nashville's Jack Armstrong registered a no-hit game against the Indians, a 4–0 Sounds victory. This was the only time in American Association history that teams played in back-to-back no-hit games.

On April 7, 2003, John Wasdin tossed a perfect game at Greer in a 4–0 win over the Albuquerque Isotopes. This was just the second nine-inning perfect complete game in the 100-year history of the Pacific Coast League. Wasdin threw 100 pitches, striking out 15 batters. Later in the year, on August 2, Colorado Springs Sky Sox pitchers Chris Gissell (7 innings pitched (IP)) and Jesús Sánchez (2 IP) combined for a no-hit 3–0 win against the Sounds. The final no-hit effort at Greer took place on July 15, 2006, when Nashville pitchers Carlos Villanueva (6 IP), Mike Meyers (2 IP), and Alec Zumwalt (1 IP) combined on a 2–0 win over the Memphis Redbirds.

No-hitters and perfect games
No.	Date	Pitcher(s)	Winning team	Score	Losing team
1	May 16, 1981	Jeff Cornell	Jacksonville Suns^{†}	4–0	Nashville Sounds
2	May 4, 1984	Jim Deshaies	Nashville Sounds^{†}	5–1	Columbus Astros
3	July 17, 1985	Bryan Kelly	Nashville Sounds^{†}	6–0	Oklahoma City 89ers
4	August 6, 1988	Randy Johnson (7 IP); Pat Pacillo (1 IP)	Nashville Sounds	1–0	Indianapolis Indians^{†}
5	August 7, 1988	Jack Armstrong	Nashville Sounds^{†}	4–0	Indianapolis Indians
6	April 7, 2003	John Wasdin	Nashville Sounds^{‡}	4–0	Albuquerque Isotopes
7	August 2, 2003	Chris Gissell (7 IP); Jesús Sánchez (2 IP)	Colorado Springs Sky Sox^{†}	3–0	Nashville Sounds
8	July 15, 2006	Carlos Villanueva (6 IP); Mike Meyers (2 IP); Alec Zumwalt (1 IP)	Nashville Sounds^{†}	2–0	Memphis Redbirds
(‡) Perfect game; (†) No-hitter

=== 24-inning game ===
On May 5–6, 2006, Greer was the site of a game which tied the record for the longest game, in terms of innings played, in Pacific Coast League history. The Sounds and the New Orleans Zephyrs competed in a 24-inning game, played over the course of two days, which lasted a total of eight hours and seven minutes. New Orleans defeated Nashville, 5–4. The record was originally set on June 8, 1909, in a game between the San Francisco Seals and Oakland Oaks. A few years later, on September 10, 1911, the record was tied by the Sacramento Solons and Portland Beavers. The Sounds and Zephyrs set the PCL records for the most pitchers used in one game by both clubs (17), and tied the record for the most players used by both clubs (40). They set the records for the most strikeouts, batting and pitching, in a game by both clubs (48), the most at bats by both teams (166), and the most assists by both teams (53). The Sounds tied the records for the most pitchers used by one team (9) and the most assists by a single team (28).

== Other events ==
In 1979 and 1980, Greer Stadium was the home of the National Association of Intercollegiate Athletics (NAIA) World Series. The Lipscomb Bisons of Nashville's Lipscomb University won the 1979 series, and the Grand Canyon Antelopes of Grand Canyon University won in 1980. Until the 2011 opening of E. S. Rose Park, the Belmont Bruins baseball team played the majority of its seasons at Greer.

In the early 1980s, Greer served as the home field for the Father Ryan High School football team. Father Ryan returned to playing at Greer from 2006 through 2008, before moving to a new school athletic complex for the 2009 season. In the football configuration, the field ran along the first base line.

Greer was the site of the City of Hope Celebrity Softball Challenge from 1991 to 2014. Two teams of country music stars participated in the game, from which proceeds went toward the research and treatment of cancer and other life-threatening diseases. Participants included Vince Gill, Carrie Underwood, Brad Paisley, Billy Ray Cyrus, Sara Evans, Montgomery Gentry, and Phil Vassar. Through the 2008 event, more than $1.5 million had been raised. In 2015, the game relocated to First Tennessee Park.

From 2001 to 2011, Greer was home to the Jeff Fisher & Friends Charity Softball Game. Then-Tennessee Titans head coach Jeff Fisher and players from the team, past and present, competed in order to benefit local charities. Titans participants included Vince Young, Steve McNair, Eddie George, Frank Wycheck, Rob Bironas, and Keith Bulluck, among others. Tomáš Vokoun and head coach Barry Trotz of the National Hockey League's Nashville Predators also took part.

The Oak Ridge Boys, including Sounds' minority shareholder Richard Sterban, were photographed standing in the seats along Greer's left field line for the cover of their 1989 album, American Dreams. In 2002, the music video for Steve Earle's "Some Dreams", a song featured in the motion picture The Rookie, was filmed at Greer. The video, intercut with clips from the film, shows Earle and his band performing the song on the empty ballpark's field.

== Scoreboard ==
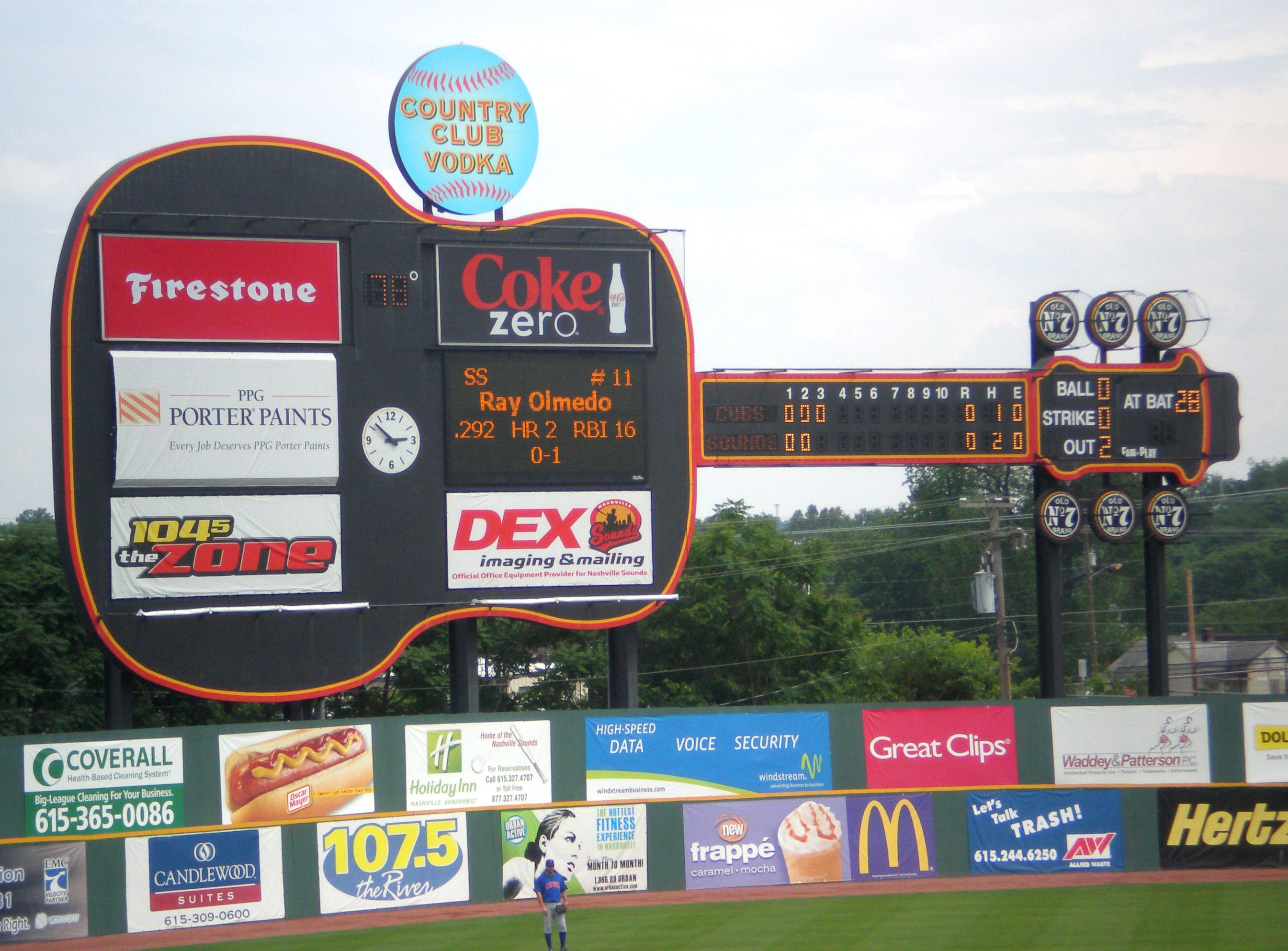
The scoreboard as it appeared in 2010

Greer's distinctive guitar-shaped scoreboard was manufactured by the Fairtron Corporation and installed by the Joslin Sign Company prior to the 1993 season at a cost of $400,000. It was originally conceived as the centerpiece for a proposed major league ballpark in Nashville sought after by owner Larry Schmittou as a part of the 1993 Major League Baseball expansion. Originally painted blue with red and white trim to match the Nashville Sounds' color scheme, it was repainted black with red, yellow, and white trim to match their then-current color scheme in 2008, and was located behind the outfield wall in left-center field.

The entire scoreboard measured 115.6 feet (35.2 m) across, 53 feet (16 m) high, and 2 feet (0.61 m) deep. Individual components of the guitar were as follows: 60-foot (18 m) body, 36-foot (11 m) neck, and 19.6-foot (6.0 m) tuning key section. It was installed approximately 80 feet (24 m) above the ground. It required 243,155 watts to power its 8,179 total lamps, which were connected to 64,169 feet (19,559 m) of wire. The entire display weighed 35,825 pounds (16,250 kg).

The line score was displayed on the guitar's neck, while the ball/strike/out count, the batter's uniform number, and the hit/error indicator were all situated on the headstock. Six small advertising signs represented the tuning keys. The body of the guitar featured only an LED display board for displaying messages. Initially, the scoreboard featured two matrix message boards: a low-resolution RGB color board on the left, which featured advertising and animations, and a white-light monochromatic board on the right, which primarily featured statistical information and other text-based messages. The monochrome board was replaced by an orange-tinted LED display board in 2009, which served both purposes, while the color board was deactivated and covered with advertising signage. The scoreboard never had the ability to display video or any kind of high-resolution images. Between the two boards were an analog clock and a temperature display. Surrounding the boards were four large spaces for advertising; the two on top were static, and the two on bottom rotated between three images each (the rotating spaces were covered with static signage beginning in 2009). High-tension nets covered the electronic sections to protect them from home run balls. Above the board was a circular advertising space. This sign originally displayed the team's guitar-swinger logo, and at times displayed other Sounds logos. Originally, when a home run was hit, the guitar-swinger logo would light up and perimeter lights around the entire scoreboard would begin flashing; it was also capable of shooting fireworks after each Sounds home run. By the mid-2000s, the scoreboard had fallen into a state of disrepair and obsolescence, and was only marginally functional. Many of the lights were no longer able to be lit, and replacement parts were becoming hard to find. When MFP Baseball purchased the team in late 2008, the organization made minor renovations to the scoreboard, rendering it once again fully functional, although not to its original specifications. It was also repainted black, red, yellow, and white over its original red, white, and blue color scheme to reflect the team's present colors at the time. By 2013, due to leaks in its exterior, the scoreboard's functionality could be crippled for a period of time following a rainstorm, rendering many of its electronic features dark.

Greer's guitar scoreboard was not moved to First Tennessee Park when the Sounds relocated there in 2015. Instead, a modern version was installed at the new venue. The first design renderings of First Tennessee Park did not feature a guitar scoreboard. On April 22, 2014, at the announcement of First Tennessee's naming rights agreement, Sounds owner Frank Ward told The Tennessean: "The guitar scoreboard at Greer is staying at Greer. At some point in time we will share what our new scoreboard will look like, but it's too early in the process. We're trying to figure it out as we speak." Two months later, on June 20, 2014, Ward announced that a new guitar scoreboard would indeed be constructed, citing overwhelming demand from the community. As a part of the stadium's 2019 demolition, the scoreboard was sold at auction for $54,815. The buyer, AJ Capital Partners, integrated the structure into the design of Nashville Warehouse Company, a mixed-use project at the corner of Chestnut Street and Fourth Avenue South, just blocks away from Greer. The scoreboard was repainted similar to its original color scheme and placed behind a bandshell overlooking a public green space.

Before the installation of the guitar, Greer's original scoreboard was a black, non-descript, rectangular unit with a 2-line reader panel. In 1985, it was moved to beside the left field foul pole to make room for a new rectangular 4-line scoreboard 10 feet (3.0 m) high with a fully animated reader panel. The original unit was then used as an out-of-town scoreboard, displaying the scores of other baseball games. When the guitar display was installed in 1993, the original scoreboard was removed and replaced by the second unit, which became the new out-of-town board. From 2008 to 2014, the out-of-town scoreboard was not used to display scores; instead it was used as a support for additional advertising signage.

== Facilities ==
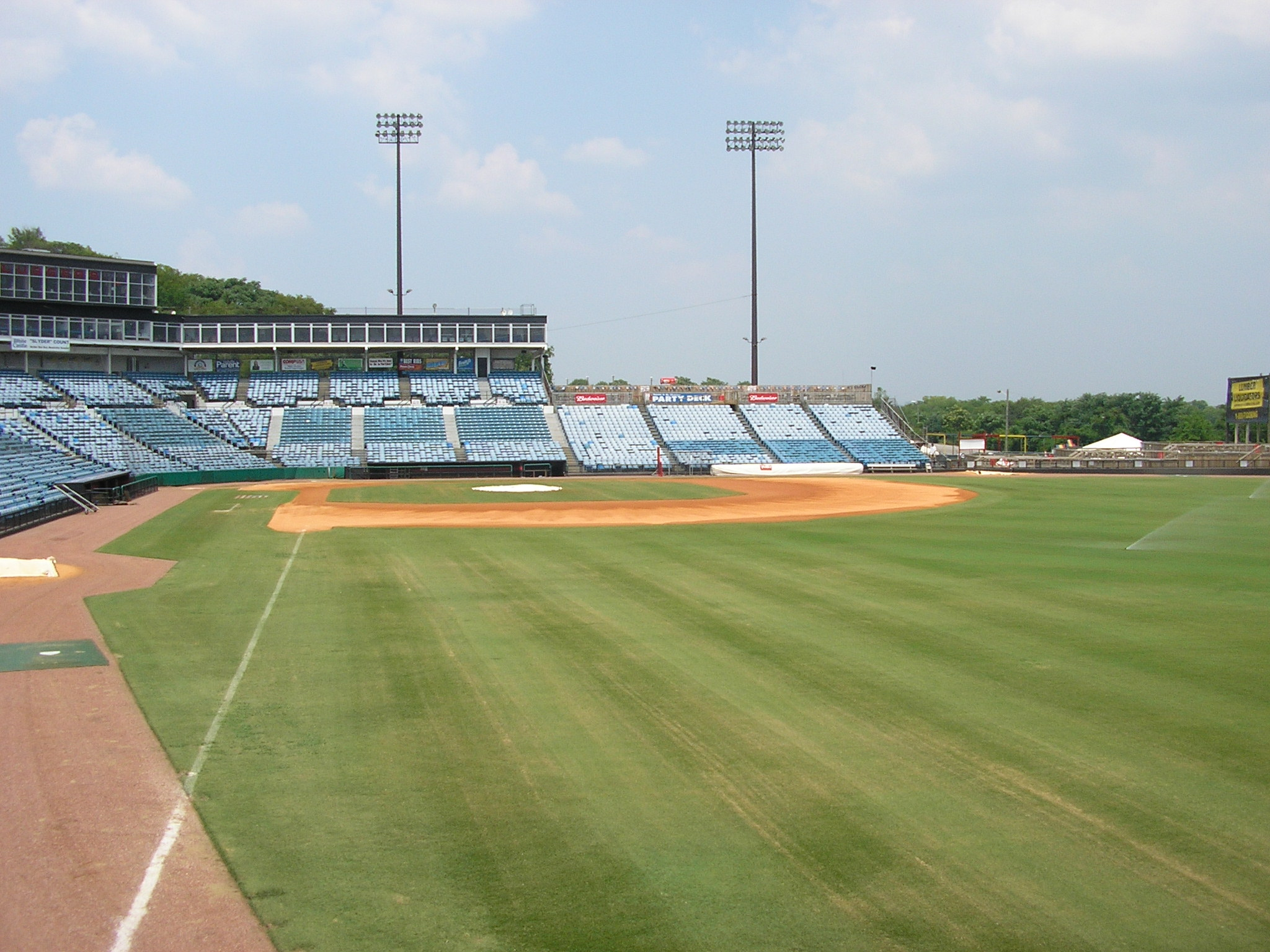
The diamond and seating bowl as seen from right field

Seating at the ballpark included fixed stadium seats, general admission bleachers, some with contoured seats, and eighteen skyboxes located on the third floor. As of 2014, total seating capacity was 10,300. Games could be watched from one of four picnic areas—one behind home plate, one on the third base line, one in the third base stands, and one beyond the right field wall. A rentable hot tub deck was located in the right field corner. There was a concert stage and family fun zone located on The Plaza inside the concourse entrance.

Several concession stands and cart vendors were located on the concourse. A full-service restaurant known as Sluggers Sports Bar and Grill, constructed in 1984 as The Hall of Fame Stadium Club, was located on the fourth floor. This was open during all Sounds home dates, and games could be viewed from the restaurant via windows overlooking the field.

== Attendance records ==
During their 37 seasons at Greer, the Nashville Sounds played 2,613 regular-season home games which were attended by a total of 14,453,823 people, for an average of 5,532 per game. The park's season attendance record of 605,122 was set in 1990, while its average attendance record of 8,108 was set in 1980. The lowest season and average attendances occurred in 1997 when 269,186 people came to games; an average of 3,739. Attendance records from 1978 through 2014 are as follows.

Attendance records
Season	Attendance	Openings	Average	Cumulative total
1978	380,159	71	5,354	380,159
1979	515,488	70	7,364	895,647
1980	575,676	71	8,108	1,471,323
1981	567,994	74	7,676	2,039,317
1982	532,449	75	7,099	2,571,766
1983	500,048	77	6,494	3,071,814
1984	376,440	76	4,953	3,448,254
1985	364,225	72	5,059	3,812,479
1986	364,614	69	5,284	4,177,093
1987	378,715	69	5,489	4,555,808
1988	317,785	70	4,540	4,873,593
1989	457,854	73	6,272	5,331,447
1990	605,122	76	7,962	5,936,569
1991	454,575	72	6,651	6,391,144
1992	489,991	72	6,805	6,881,135
1993	438,745	72	6,094	7,319,880
1994	300,821	72	4,178	7,620,701
1995	355,133	72	4,932	7,975,834
1996	303,407	72	4,214	8,279,241
1997	269,186	72	3,739	8,548,427
1998	323,068	72	4,487	8,871,495
1999	335,901	71	4,731	9,207,396
2000	269,682	69	3,908	9,477,078
2001	305,385	69	4,426	9,782,463
2002	322,059	69	4,668	10,104,522
2003	387,345	67	5,781	10,491,867
2004	405,536	67	6,053	10,897,403
2005	419,412	69	6,078	11,316,815
2006	410,569	69	5,950	11,727,384
2007	411,959	70	5,885	12,139,343
2008	354,662	67	5,293	12,494,005
2009	305,434	68	4,492	12,799,439
2010	319,235	67	4,765	13,118,674
2011	335,143	69	4,857	13,453,817
2012	321,042	67	4,792	13,774,859
2013	355,003	70	5,071	14,129,892
2014	323,961	66	4,909	14,453,823
Totals	14,453,823	2,613	5,532	—

== See also ==
- List of baseball parks in Nashville, Tennessee
