= Joyce Greer de Holesch =

Australian concert pianist

- Born: May 6, 1918; Elsternwick, Victoria
- Died: January 1, 2009 (aged 90)
- Occupation: Concert Pianist

Joyce Greer de Holesch (1918–2009) was an Australian concert pianist who performed around the world. When World War II interrupted her European tour, she returned to Australia before moving on to New York City.

== Early life and education ==
Joyce Greer was born at Elsternwick, Victoria in Australia. She began to play the piano at the age of three.

In 1934, she won the inaugural Frank Homewood Memorial Scholarship, which gave her an opportunity to study at the University of Melbourne for three years. She also played with the international conductor Sir Bernard Heinze who was dean of the faculty at that time.

In 1937, she moved to London with her mother and studied with an English pianist Tobias Matthay.

== Career ==
In 1938, Joyce won the Bach Prize in London, and she also won the Musical Initiative Prize in the next year in London. She got a chance to perform in the Queen's Hall in London by the later prize.

In this time of her early career in London, she played as the soloist with the Halle’ Orchestra under Eugene Ormandy. She also played with the Royal Philharmonic Orchestra under Sir John Barbirolli.

In late 1939, she returned to Australia, because WWII had broken out in Europe. She started her career in Australia in 1940. She played a series of successful recitals and began to travel around the country.

In 1942, she played the music of Brahms and Bach in the Assembly Hall in Melbourne.

In June 1943, she played Beethoven's Emperor Concerto with the Melbourne Symphony Orchestra.

In 1945, she played Grieg's concerto with the Brisbane Orchestra with Eugene Ormandy. In the same year, she and her husband moved to New York where she studied with Egon Petri and Ignaz Friedman.

In 1957, she played in Lieder Halle in Stuttgart.

In December 1957, she made her Town Hall debut in New York City, she played the music of Beethoven, Liszt, Mendelssohn, Debussy, and Chopin.

In March 1968, she played the music of Haydn, Beethoven, and Rachmaninoff at Wigmore Hall in London.

== Personal life ==
Joyce Greer married a Hungarian-born painter Denes de Holesch in 1944. They had two children, Laura and Hugo. Laura was born in Lilydale, Victoria in 1944; she married Christopher Hampton in 1971. Hugo was born in Montreal, Canada in 1946, has a Ph.D. In Philosophy from Sorbonne, Paris and currently lives in Budapest.
