= Jane Grier =

Irish textile artist (1856 - 1902)

- Born: 1856; Longford, Ireland
- Died: 13 September 1902 (aged 45–46); Dresden, German Empire
- Notable work: Taschentuch (Handkerchief)
- Movement: Outsider art

Jane Grier, also known as Miss G., (born 1856 in Longford, Ireland; died 13 September 1902 in Dresden), was an Irish governess and textile artist. She became known through a colorfully embroidered handkerchief that she made in a psychiatric institution and which is counted as "art brut".

== Life ==
Jane Grier was born in Longford in 1856. Nothing was known about her for a long time; only her work, the "Taschentuch" ("Handkerchief"), was listed in the Prinzhorn Collection. It has the signature "Miss G." on it, so it was given that name. It was not until the early 2020s that research was able to determine that "Miss G." was Irishwoman Jane Grier. Grier lived with her mother and sister in Dresden's "Zu den Vier Jahreszeiten" Hotel; her father had emigrated to Australia as a naval doctor. Grier traveled extensively prior to her admission to the asylum. She attended the Dresden Conservatory from 1878 to 1879 and studied piano there with Emil Robert Höpner. She then lived as a governess and companion in Dresden.

From August 1892, Grier felt she was being watched. She dressed unusually, was agitated, behaved in a conspicuous manner and was "morally objectionable". As a result, her family placed her in the Royal Saxon Sanatorium and Catering Facility Sonnenstein. She was housed there from October 1892 to May 1893. According to her medical records, she erotically forced herself on the doctors there and exposed herself. She was particularly enthusiastic about the doctor Willfuhr, for whom she embroidered the handkerchief.

Grier was released from the asylum on 23 May 1893. When asked by the hotel owner whether she could stay in the hotel again, the institution replied that she was "mentally ill but not dangerous to the public", but that she "must be kept clean, orderly and decency and restrained by gentlemen". Then she came to the municipal supply house in Dresden. As a result, she was probably again in the Pirna-Sonnenstein sanatorium and nursing home around 1897. In 1902 she died in Dresden at the age of 46 in the municipal infirmary on Löbtauer Straße.

== Work ==
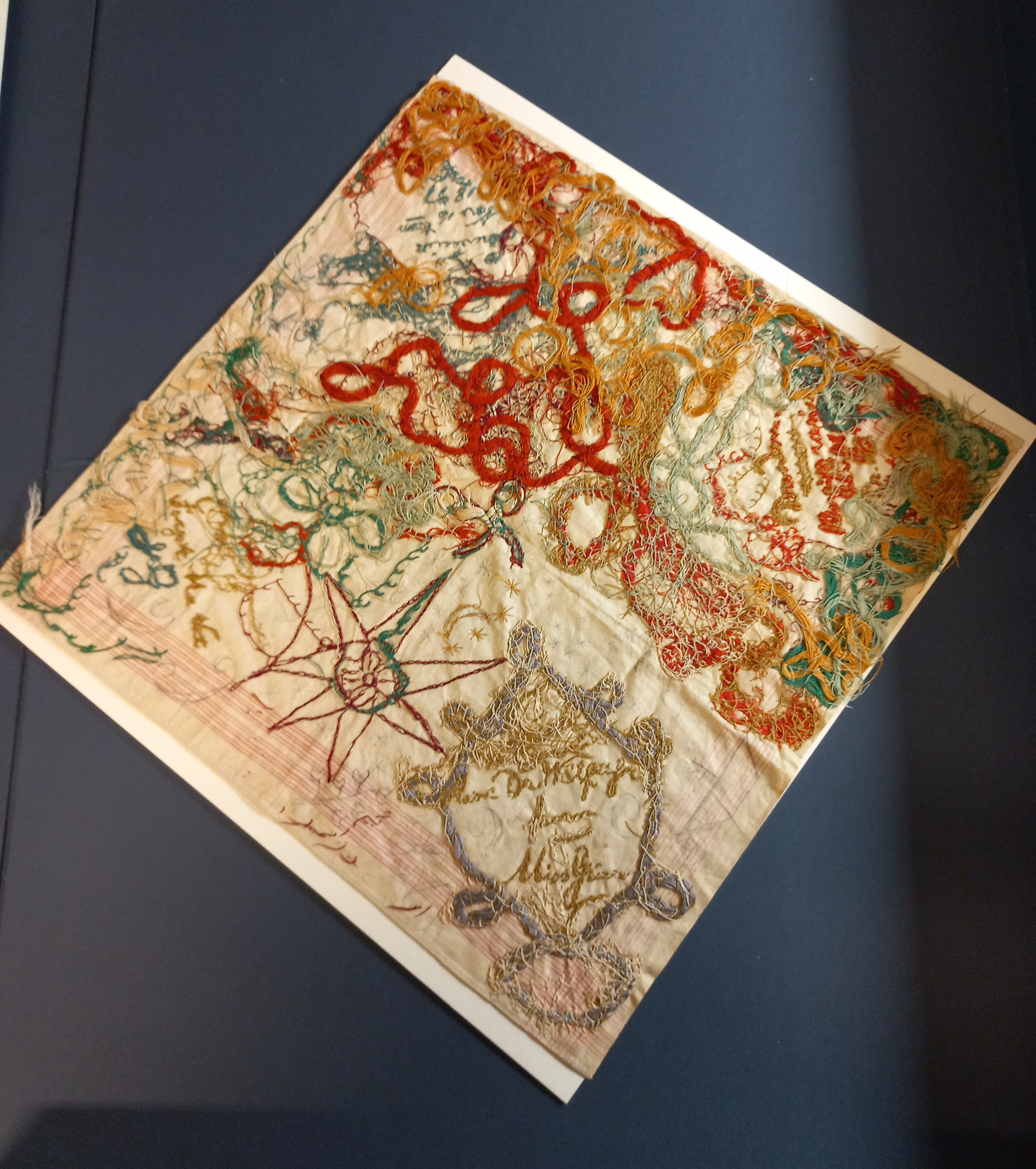
"Taschentuch" (Handkerchief) by Jane Grier, Signature in bottom right

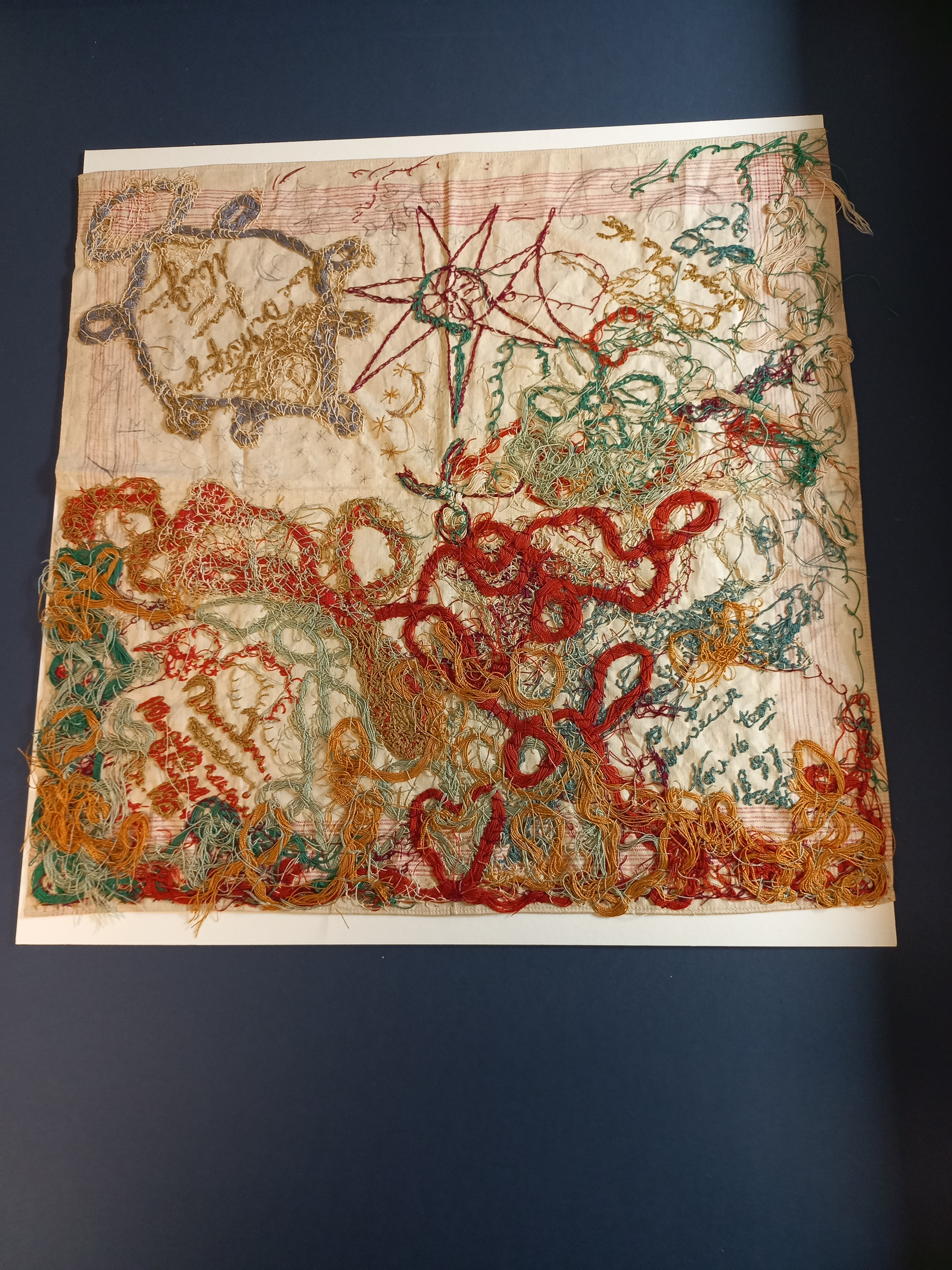
The same work, dating "Nov. 16 1897" bottom right

In the institution, Grier began to embroider. She used a handkerchief as a basis and started with a preliminary drawing, which she executed in pencil. In her embroidery she asks the doctor Willfuhr to "Forget me not". At that time, Willfuhr was working as an assistant doctor in the Dresden mental asylum; whether he cared for Grier directly cannot be proven. Next to a heart formed from a thick bundle of red thread, "Souvenir tears Nov. 16 1897" can be deciphered. Thus the handkerchief was created on 16 November 1897.

In 1913, Emil Kraepelin included the handkerchief in the 8th revised edition of his psychiatry textbook. It is an "example of the peculiar works of art" of those suffering from dementia praecox. With the work he wanted to prove the "loss of taste in screaming color combinations and strange forms". The handkerchief reached Heidelberg via Georg Ilberg, who was Kraepelin's assistant in Heidelberg until 1893 and then senior physician in Pirna-Sonnenstein until 1902. Ilberg must have sent it to Kraepelin in Heidelberg between 1897 and 1902. Like other pieces in his collection, Kraepelin left it in Heidelberg, where he had headed the university clinic from 1891 to 1903, when he accepted a call to Munich as director of the university psychiatric clinic. Hans Prinzhorn took this basic stock into his collection.

In 2010, the then director of the collection, Thomas Röske, described this work of "Miss G." as initially characterised by cartouches with verbal messages. He took up Gisela Steinlechner's interpretation that the resulting uneven appearance was "the result of a sudden burst of resistance energy". Alongside this interpretation, he posited a view that a "desire for enhancement of ornament" had gained the upper hand, that ornament might have trumped the "initial structure and intention".

== Exhibitions (Selection) ==
- 1996/1997: Beyond Reason. Art and Psychosis. Hayward Gallery, London
- 2004–2006: Irre ist weiblich. Travelling exhibition: Prinzhorn Collection Heidelberg 2004, Altonaer Museum Hamburg 2005, Swiss Cantons Art Museum in Ittingen Charterhouse in Warth-Weiningen2005, Muzeum Sztuki w Łodzi (Kunstmuseum Lódz) 2005/2006
- Vergissmeinnicht. Einblicke ins Anstaltsleben um 1900 ("Forget Me Not. Insights into institutional life around 1900."). Prinzhorn Collection, Heidelberg, 8 July – 31 October 2010
- Von Kirchner bis heute. Künstler reagieren auf die Sammlung Prinzhorn("From Kirchner to today. Artists react to the Prinzhorn Collection"). 7 May – 14 August 2011
- Taschentücher: "Trost und Tränen im Quadrat" ("Handkerchiefs: 'Sadness and tears squared'"). Herxheim Museum, 30 May – 26 September 2021
- Raum der Zeichnung (Drawing Space). Port25 contemportary art space Mannheim, 3 September – 6 November 2022

== Sources ==
- von Beyme, Ingrid; Hohnholz, Sabine (2018). Vergissmeinnicht – Psychiatriepatienten und Anstaltsleben um 1900 [Forget-me-not - psychiatric patients and institutional life around 1900] (in German). Springer-Verlag. pp. 242–244. ISBN 978-3-662-55531-6.
- von Beyme, Ingrid (2013). Röske, Thomas (ed.). ungesehen und unerhört. Künstler reagieren auf die Sammlung Prinzhorn -Band 1 [unseen and unheard of. Artists react to the 'Prinzhorn' collection. Part 1]. Heidelberg: Verlag Das Wunderhorn. pp. 182–191. ISBN 978-3-88423-406-8.
- Wernli, Martina (2012). Wissen und Nicht-Wissen in der Klinik Dynamiken der Psychiatrie um 1900. transcript. p. 168. ISBN 9783837619348.
- Thomas Röske: Krankheitssymptom oder kritisches Aufbegehren? Stick-, Näh- und Häkelwerke aus der Psychiatrie, in: Tristan Weddigen (Hrsg.): Metatextile. Emsdetten 2010, S. 51–61.
- Bettina Brand-Claussen, Viola Michely (Hrsg.): Irre ist weiblich. Künstlerische Interventionen von Frauen in der Psychiatrie um 1900. Verlag Wunderhorn, Heidelberg 2004, ISBN 978-3-88423-218-7, S. 140–141, 256
