= Herschel Lynn Greer =

American businessman

- Born: August 24, 1906; Dickson County, Tennessee, U.S.
- Died: March 19, 1976 (aged 69); Houston, Texas, U.S.
- Occupation(s): Founder of Guaranty Mortgage Company; President of Vols, Inc.

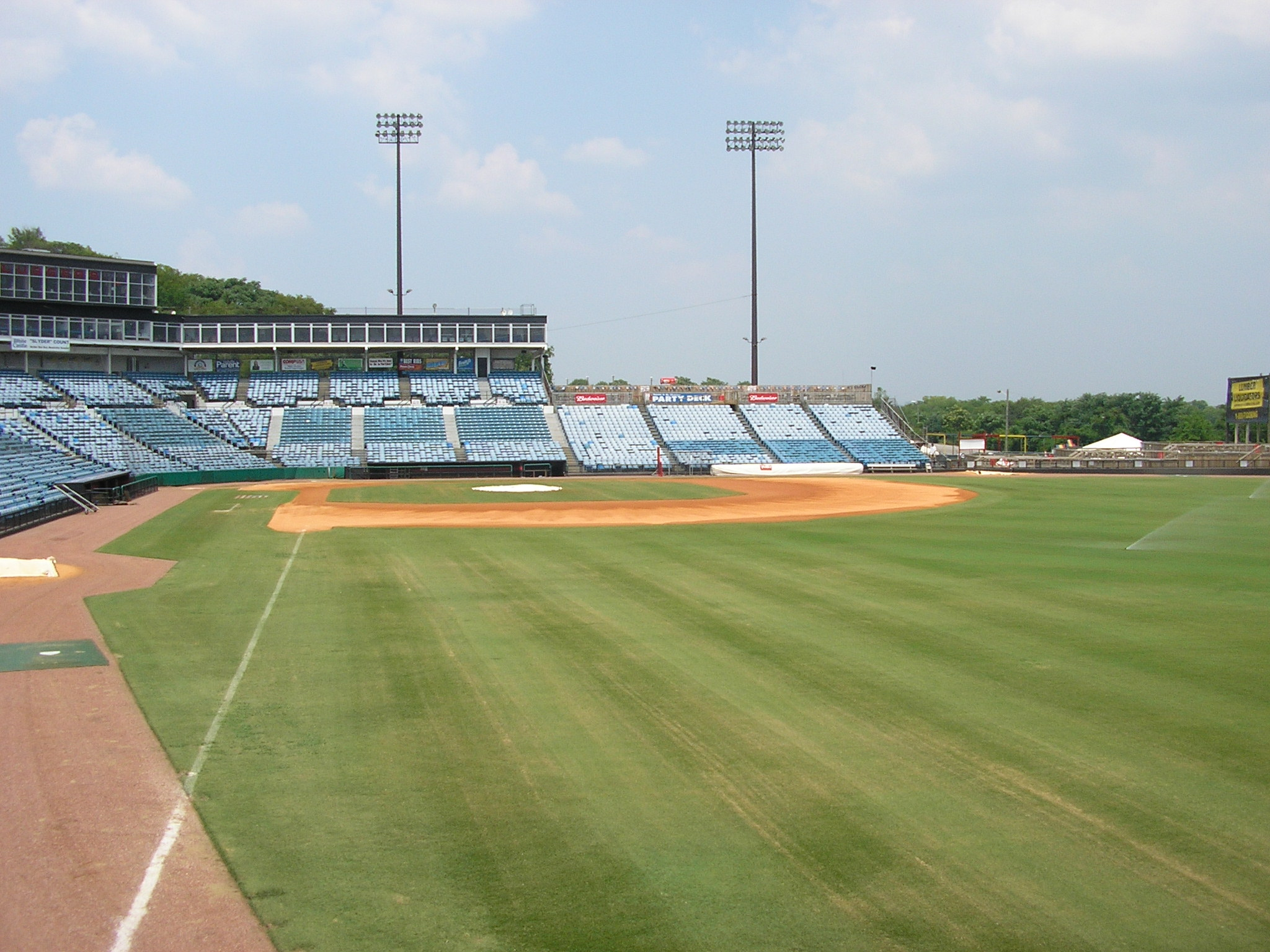
Herschel Greer Stadium was named in posthumous honor of Herschel Lynn Greer.

Herschel Lynn Greer (August 24, 1906 – March 19, 1976) was a prominent businessman and the first president of Vols, Inc., an ownership group organized in 1959 for the purpose of keeping the Nashville Vols Minor League Baseball franchise in Nashville, Tennessee.

Greer worked in the financial sector, co-organizing Guaranty Mortgage Company in 1940. He served as its President and Chairman of the Board until 1969. In January 1959, Greer and thirteen other Nashville businessmen, including country music star Eddy Arnold, formed Vols, Inc. The company sold 4,876 shares of stock at $5 each. Vols, Inc. was successful in keeping the Nashville Vols in the city from 1959 to 1961. The Southern Association, of which the Vols were members, collapsed after the 1961 season. The team did not play in 1962. In 1963, the Vols played one final season in the South Atlantic League. The team had a debt of $22,000 that could not be paid, forcing the ownership group to surrender their franchise to the league. This was the last year that professional baseball was played at Sulphur Dell ballpark, the home of the Vols, before it was demolished in 1969.

== Death and legacy ==
Herschel Greer died from cancer on March 19, 1976, in the M.D. Anderson Research Institute in Houston, Texas. He was 69 years old. He is buried in Nashville’s Woodlawn Memorial Park and Mausoleum.

Two years later, in 1978, Larry Schmittou brought the Nashville Sounds, an expansion team of the Double-A Southern League, to Nashville. The Greer family donated $25,000 for construction of the team's new stadium. The ballpark was named Herschel Greer Stadium in his honor. It served as the home of the Sounds from 1978 through 2014, after which they left the stadium for a new stadium, First Tennessee Park, built on the site of Sulphur Dell. Greer Stadium was demolished in 2019.
