= Daniel Greer =

American lawyer

Daniel Greer (born 1940) is a disbarred attorney and Orthodox rabbi and the founder of the Yeshiva of New Haven and a one time candidate for the Democratic nomination for a New York State Assembly District who in 2017 was found liable of sexually abusing and raping one of his male students while the latter was a teenager in Greer's yeshiva. In 2019 he was sentenced to 20 years in prison.

Greer is also the father of the lead plaintiff in the case of the "Yale Five", in which Orthodox Jewish students sued Yale over the university's coed dorm policy, claiming it was discriminatory, but ultimately lost the case.

Greer, who had vocally opposed gay-rights in court, was found liable of raping one of his teenage male students "hundreds of times" over the course of a number of years. In a civil trial, in which Greer chose to plead the fifth out of fear of self-incrimination, he was found liable of the charges of sexual abuse by a federal jury. The court awarded the plaintiff $15 Million in compensatory damages, to be paid by Greer and his yeshiva.

== Biography ==
Greer was born in New York City to Moses and Angele Greer. Angele was a native of Egypt and a graduate of the University of Paris. Moses was a graduate of City College of New York and a wholesale wool seller. His parents were both Modern Orthodox Jews, and Greer grew up attending day school. He went to high school at the Manhattan Talmudical Academy.

Greer attended college at Princeton University, where for his first two years he would eat alone in his room so he could have kosher food. He spent his junior year studying at Hebrew University of Jerusalem, after which he switched from being a biology major to being a Near Eastern studies major. After graduating from Princeton Greer spent a year studying Talmud and related subjects under Rabbi Joseph Soloveitchik.

Greer then entered Yale Law School, where he was a roommate of Jerry Brown. Other members of his Yale Law class included Gary Hart and Michael Horowitz. After graduating Greer worked for a short time at a Wall Street law firm, but quickly moved into the administration of John V. Lindsay. He initially was an examining attorney for the Commissioner of Investigations, then general counsel and later Deputy Commissioner for Ports and Terminals and head of the city's Firearms Control Board.

During this time he also became affiliated with the Soviet Jewry Movement and was one of the moving figures in getting the United States State Department to intervene in the Leonid Rigerman case. In 1971 he married Sarah Bergman, a Jewish day school teacher.

In 1972 Greer ran against incumbent Richard Gottfried for the Democratic nomination for the state assembly in one of the Upper West Side Manhattan districts. Both candidates tried to project themselves as running on a campaign plank for McGovern and Peace. However Greer was becoming disenchanted with the welfare state and even more so with Lindsay's community control of schools which led to the firing of many Jewish teachers to make room for African-American ones.

In 1973 Greer and his wife went to Israel with work permits and plans to make aliyah. They arrived in time to be there through the Yom Kippur War. Greer apprenticed in law under Eliyahu Lankin, the man who captained the Altalena which was sunk on the orders of David Ben-Gurion and Yitzchak Rabin.

Greer also studied to be ordained a rabbi with Rabbi Yehoshua Neuwirth. Greer's wife Sarah studied under Nehama Leibowitz. Their first son, Dov, was also born in Israel.

== New Haven ==
In 1977, after moving to New Haven, Greer helped found the Gan School, an experimental Orthodox day school that blended religion and education. Greer continued to work as a lawyer for 14 years. He also served for a time as the Police Commissioner of the New Haven Police Department.

Over the years the Greers expanded their day school into a full yeshiva with both an elementary school and boys and girls high schools (now defunct). He also formed various organizations to redevelop the neighborhood where his yeshiva was located, including fighting the prostitution in the neighborhood.

Greer's children went to Yale. After the change in policy in 1995 that required even students with families in New Haven to live on campus, he sought an exemption for his daughter Batsheva on the grounds that living in co-ed dorms that freely distributed condoms, had lectures on safe sex and co-ed bathrooms were incompatible with Orthodox Judaism. Yale refused to cooperate, so the Greers paid the rent for a room their daughter had never even entered. In December 1997 Batsheba and three others brought a suit against Yale. The fifth of the Yale Five had married three months earlier than planned to avoid having to follow Yale's rules.

== Child sexual assault and rape of teenage students ==
In May 2016, Greer was sued by Eliyahu Mirlis, a former student at the yeshiva, for repeated sexual assault, including oral and anal sex during the time he was in Greer's high school, from 2001 to 2005. The suit additionally alleges that Greer sexually abused a second student. One of the students had a separate case in which he was the plaintiff dropped as a result of testifying against Mr. Greer. However, on May 17, 2017, a jury awarded the plaintiffs $20 million in damages against Rabbi Greer and his yeshiva.

== Imprisonment ==
On December 2, 2019, after a separate criminal trial in which he was found guilty, Greer was sentenced to 20 years in prison, suspended after 12, with incarceration to begin immediately given that he represented a substantial flight risk.

On November 5, 2025, a Superior Court Judge modified Greer's sentence to time served followed by 10 years of probation given originally to begin immediately upon release.

== Sources ==
- Samuel G. Freedman. Jew Vs. Jew: The Struggle for the Soul of American Jewry. (New York: Simon and Schuster, 2000) p. 231-263.
- Jewish Student Press service article on Yale housing dispute
- Aug 26, 2009 Ha'aretz article on Greer
- brownalumnimagazine.com
