= Grierson =

Grierson may refer to:

- Clan Grierson, a Scottish clan
- Grierson (name), a surname (including a list of people with the name)
- Grierson (film), a 1973 Canadian documentary
- Grierson, a GWR 3031 Class steam locomotive of the Great Western Railway
- Grierson family of BC/AB/NB/NS (possible the hiers to the Grierson clan baronetage)

== See also ==
- Grierson's Raid, an 1863 Union cavalry raid during the Vicksburg Campaign of the American Civil War
- Grierson Spring (Texas), in Reagan County
- Grierson Awards, a British documentary film award
