= Thomas Greer (senator) =

Thomas Macgregor Greer (31 January 1853 – 19 February 1928) was a unionist politician in Northern Ireland.

McGreer studied at Trinity College, Dublin, before becoming a solicitor. He was elected to the first Senate of Northern Ireland as an Ulster Unionist Party member, despite having no political experience, and served for six-and-a-half years.

Coat of arms of Thomas Greer

Notes
Confirmed 24 April 1915 by George James Burtchaell, Deputy Ulster King of Arms.
Crest
An eagle displayed Proper charged on the breast with a quadtangular lock Argent.
Torse
Of the colours.
Escutcheon
Quarterly 1st & 4th Azure a lion rampant Or armed and langued Gules between three antique crowns of the second on a canton Argent an oak tree eradicated surmounted by a sword in bend sinister ensigned on the point with a royal crown all Proper (Greer) 2nd & 3rd Gules a garb banded Or on a chief of the last three human hearts of the first (Owden).
Motto
Memor Esto
