= Thomas Greer (footballer) =

Scottish footballer

Personal information
- Full name: Thomas Gershom Greer
- Date of birth: 1889
- Place of birth: Bathgate, Scotland
- Date of death: Unknown
- Place of death: Scotland
- Position: Centre forward

Senior career*
Years	Team	Apps	(Gls)
–	Coatbridge Rob Roy		
1910–1912	Birmingham	2	(0)
1912–1913	Reading		
1913–19??	Swansea Town		
- * Club domestic league appearances and goals

Thomas Gershom Greer (1889 – after 1912) was a Scottish professional footballer who played in the English Football League for Birmingham.

Greer was born in Bathgate, West Lothian. He joined Birmingham from Coatbridge Rob Roy in December 1910, and made his debut in the Second Division on 21 January 1911, deputising for regular centre forward Jack Hall in a home game against Burnley which finished as a 1–1 draw. Greer played only once more for the first team, early the following season and again standing in for Hall. He moved on to Southern League club Reading in August 1912 and a season later joined fellow Southern League side Swansea Town.
