= List of San Francisco Seals no-hitters =

The following is a list of no-hitters by the Pacific Coast League (PCL) baseball club the San Francisco Seals. The Seals were one of the five charter teams of the PCL, established in 1903. During their run, from 1903 to 1957, the team recorded 12 no-hitters. In total, eleven pitchers threw no-hitters for the team, with Charles Fanning credited with two, including the first in franchise history.

== No-hitters ==
Key
Score	Game score with no-hitter team's runs listed first
Location	Stadium in italics denotes a no-hitter thrown in a home game.
Score (#)	A number following a score indicates number of innings in a game that was shorter or longer than 9 innings.
Pitcher (#)	A number following a pitcher's name indicates multiple no-hitters thrown.
IP	Innings pitched
†	Indicates a perfect game

No-hitters
No.	Date	Pitcher(s)	Score	Opponent	Location	Notes	Ref.
1	July 13, 1904	Frank Barber	1–0	Oakland Commuters	Recreation Park		
2	July 16, 1905	Jimmy Whelan	2–0 (7)	Seattle Siwashes	Recreation Park		
3	October 13, 1906	Fred Brown	3–0	Oakland Commuters	Idora Park		
4	July 5, 1909	Frank Browning	3–0	Sacramento Sacts	Oak Park		
5	August 20, 1910	Frank Miller	3–1	Vernon Tigers	Recreation Park	Vernon scored a run after Roy Brashear drew a walk, advanced to second base when the next batter also walked, and came home to score on a throwing error in the eighth inning.	
6	April 25, 1911	Harry Suter	1–0	Oakland Oaks	Freeman's Park		
7	May 21, 1912	Red Toner	2–0	Portland Beavers	Recreation Park		
8	October 25, 1914	Charles Fanning (1)	7–0	Portland Beavers	Ewing Field		
9	June 23, 1916	Charles Fanning (2)	4–1	Vernon Tigers	Washington Park	Vernon scored a run after Walt Doan drew a walk, stole second base, advanced to third on a sacrifice fly, and came home on another sac fly in the fourth inning.	
10	April 14, 1923	Jim Scott	5–0	Oakland Oaks	Oaks Park		
11	May 14, 1930	Jimmy Zinn	8–0	Sacramento Senators	Moreing Field		
12	April 24, 1952	Elmer Singleton	0–1 (13)	Sacramento Solons	Seals Stadium	Singleton allowed no hits through 12 innings before allowing a hit in the 13th, in which Sacramento scored the winning run.	

== See also ==
- List of Pacific Coast League no-hitters
