= List of Pacific Coast League no-hitters =

Doc Newton pitched the first no-hitter in the Pacific Coast League on November 8, 1903, for the Los Angeles Angels.

Since the foundation of the Pacific Coast League (PCL) in 1903, its pitchers have thrown 169 no-hitters, which include 10 perfect games. Of these no-hitters, 108 were pitched in games that lasted at least the full 9 innings, while 61 were pitched in games shortened due to weather or that were played in doubleheaders, which are typically 7 innings. Only 3 of the league's 10 perfect games were tossed in full 9-inning games. Eleven no-hitters, including one perfect game, were combined—thrown by two or more pitchers on the same team.

A no-hit game occurs when a pitcher (or pitchers) allows no hits during the entire course of a game. A batter may still reach base via a walk, an error, a fielder's choice, a hit by pitch, a passed ball or wild pitch on strike three, or catcher's interference. Due to these methods of reaching base, it is possible for a team to score runs without getting any hits. While the vast majority of no-hitters are shutouts, teams which went hitless have managed to score runs in their respective games 24 times in PCL games, some in extra innings.

The first Pacific Coast League no-hitter was thrown on November 8, 1903, by Doc Newton of the Los Angeles Angels against the Oakland Recruits at Chutes Park in Los Angeles, California. The first perfect game was pitched on May 31, 1943, by Cotton Pippen of the Oakland Oaks against the Sacramento Solons at Moreing Field in Sacramento, California, as part of a seven-inning doubleheader. The first nine-inning perfect game occurred on July 7, 2001, when John Halama of the Tacoma Rainiers accomplished the feat against the Calgary Cannons at Cheney Stadium in Tacoma, Washington.

Nine league pitchers have thrown multiple no-hitters. The pitcher who holds the record for the shortest time between no-hit games is Tom Drees, who pitched two for the Vancouver Canadians five days apart in 1989. Drees threw a third no-hitter that season, giving him the record for the most career PCL no-hitters. After Drees, Charley Hall (1905 and 1906), Eli Cates (1906 and 1907), Charles Fanning (1914 and 1916), Elmer Singleton (1952 and 1955), Roger Bowman (1952 and 1954), Sam McDowell (1961 and 1964), Dick Estelle (1964 and 1965), and Alan Foster (both in 1967) have each thrown two no-hitters.

The team with the most no-hitters is the Portland Beavers, with 21, one of which was a perfect game. They are followed by the Oakland Commuters/Oaks (17 no-hitters, 1 a perfect game) and the Tacoma Rainiers (previously known as the Tigers, Giants, Twins, and Yankees; 17 no-hitters). The team with the most perfect games is the Nashville Sounds, with two. Of the three nine-inning perfect games in the league's history, two were thrown by Nashville.

== No-hitters ==
Key
Score	Game score with no-hitter team's runs listed first
Location	Stadium in italics denotes a no-hitter thrown in a home game.
Score (#)	A number following a score indicates number of innings in a game that was shorter or longer than 9 innings.
Pitcher (#)	A number following a pitcher's name indicates multiple no-hitters thrown.
IP	Innings pitched
†	Indicates a perfect game

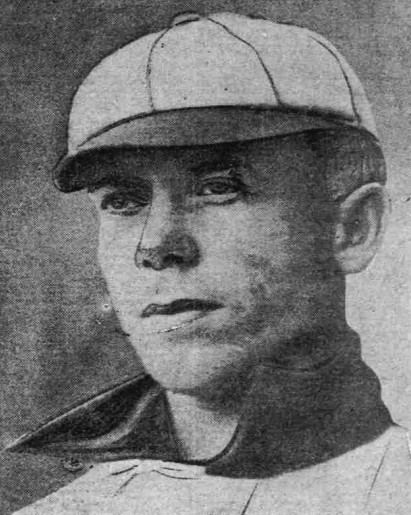
Bob Groom, who pitched a no-hitter for the Portland Beavers on June 16, 1907, pitched another for the St. Louis Browns in 1917.

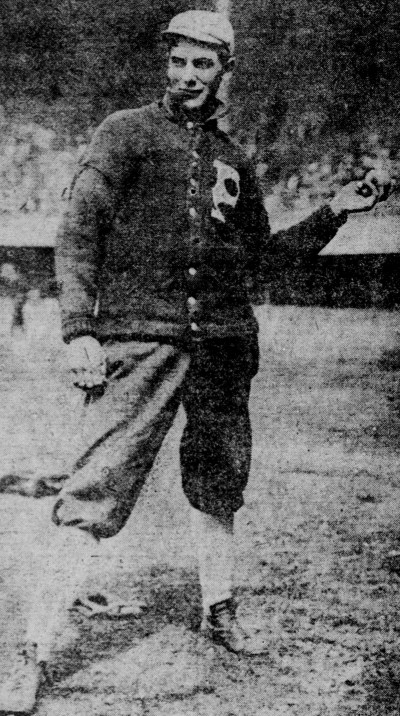
Vean Gregg threw a no-hitter for the Portland Beavers on September 2, 1910.

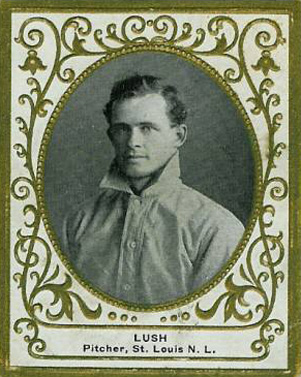
Johnny Lush, who pitched a no-hit game for the Portland Beavers on September 20, 1914, pitched a no-hitter for the Philadelphia Phillies in 1906.

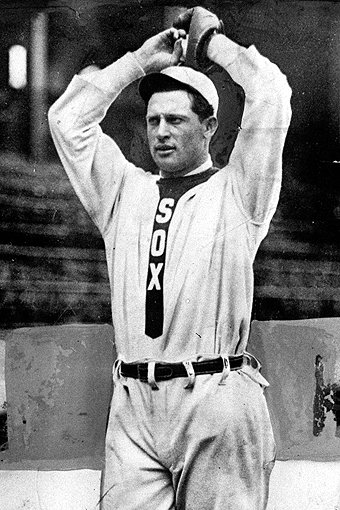
Ed Walsh, who threw a no-hitter for the Oakland Oaks on August 18, 1933, was inducted into the Baseball Hall of Fame in 1946.

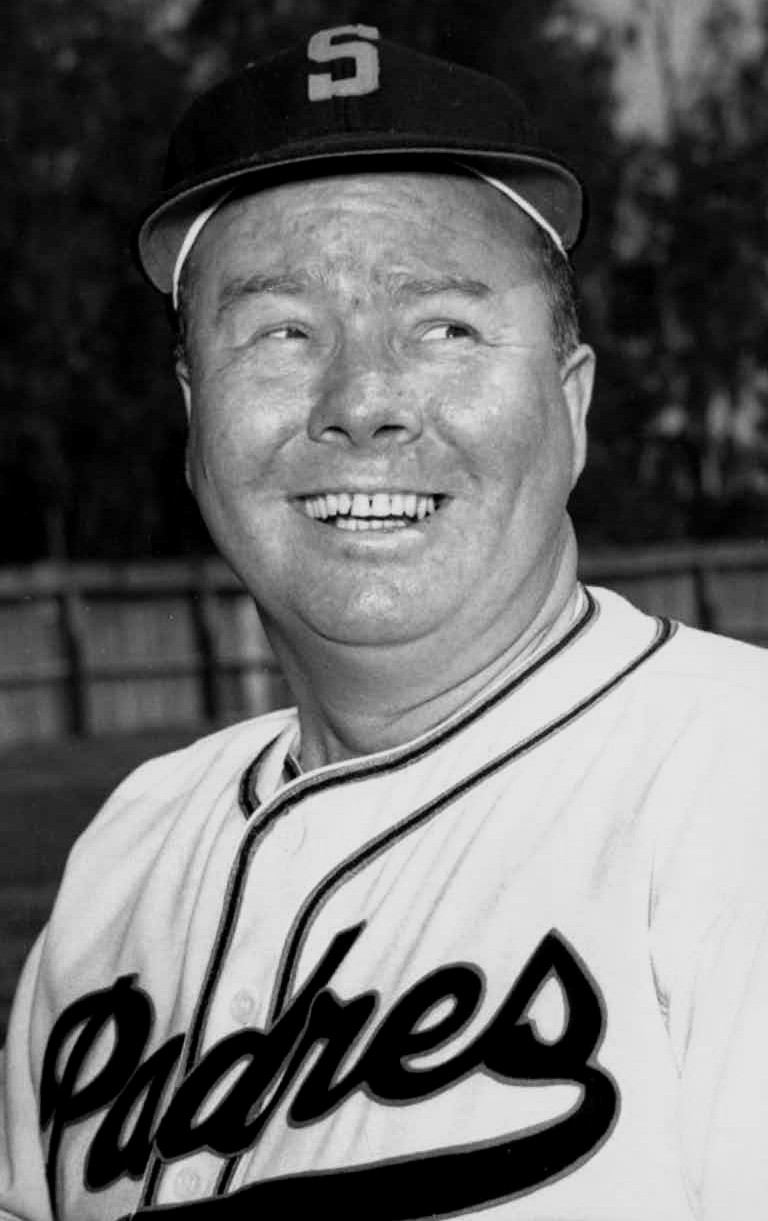
Dick Barrett, who had a perfect game for the Seattle Rainiers on May 16, 1948, was inducted into the PCL Hall of Fame in 1951.

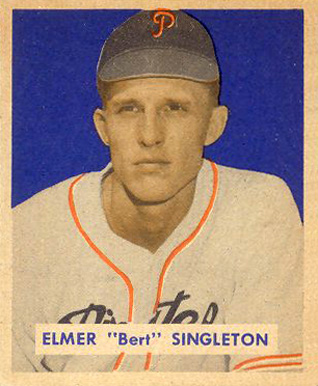
Elmer Singleton recorded two PCL no-hitters: first for the San Francisco Seals in 1952 and then for the Seattle Rainiers in 1955.

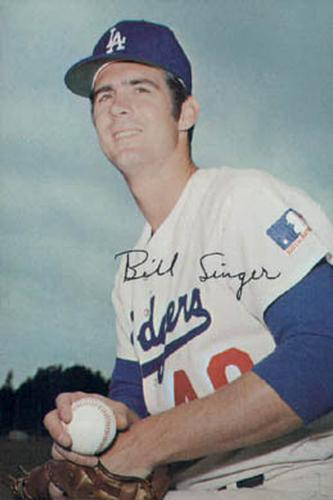
Bill Singer, who had a no-hitter for the Spokane Indians on April 23, 1964, threw another for the Los Angeles Dodgers in 1970.

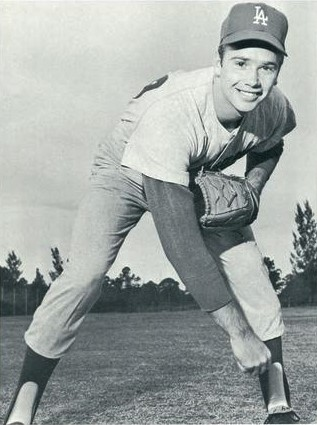
Alan Foster had two no-hitters for the Spokane Indians in 1967 (August 16 and September 1).

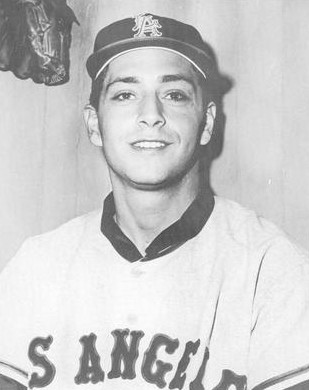
Bo Belinsky, who pitched a no-hit game for the Hawaii Islanders on August 18, 1968, threw a no-hitter for the Los Angeles Dodgers in 1962.

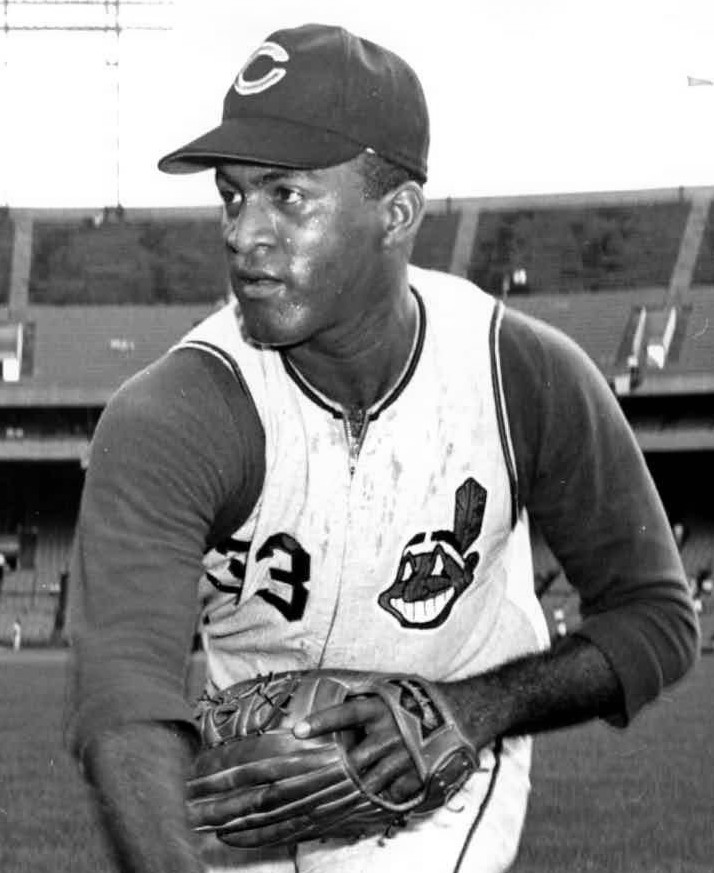
Luis Tiant had a no-hitter for the Portland Beavers on April 18, 1981.

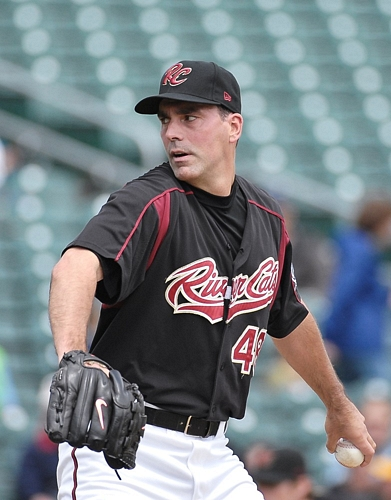
John Halama pitched the first nine-inning perfect game in the PCL for the Tacoma Rainiers on July 7, 2001.

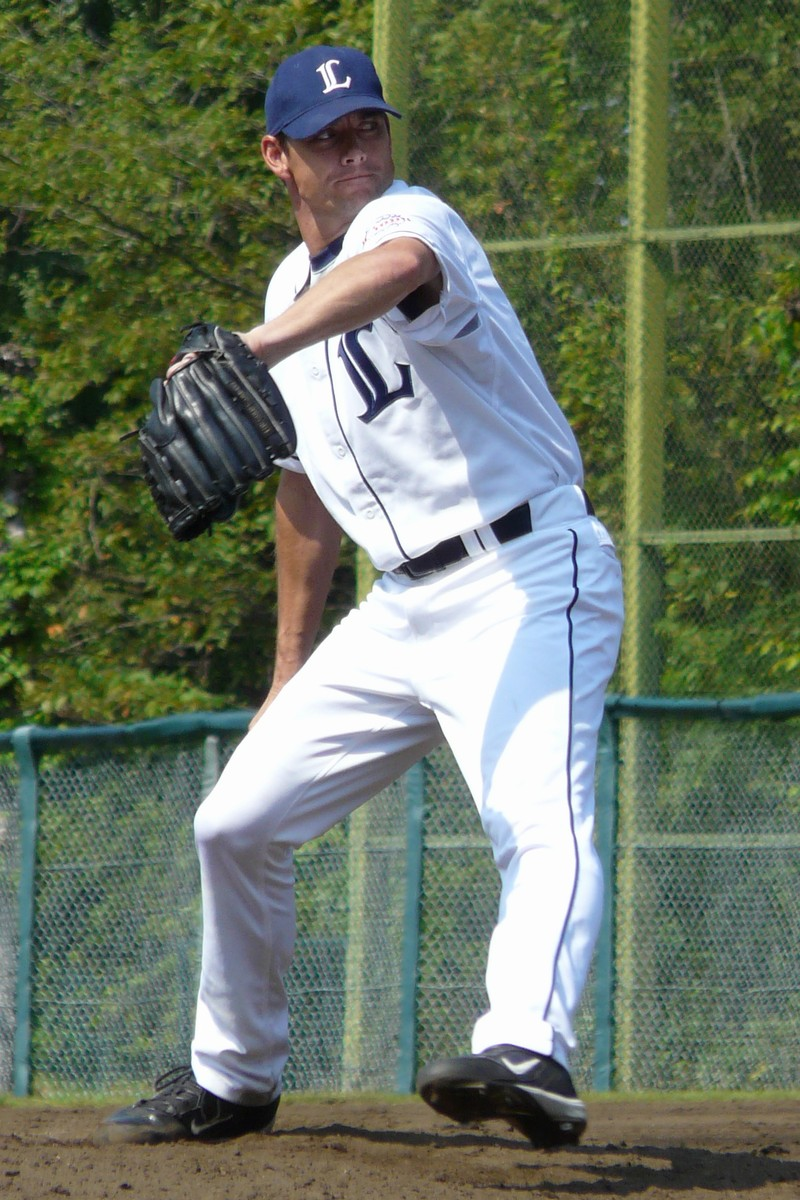
John Wasdin threw the second nine-inning perfect game in the PCL for the Nashville Sounds on April 7, 2003.

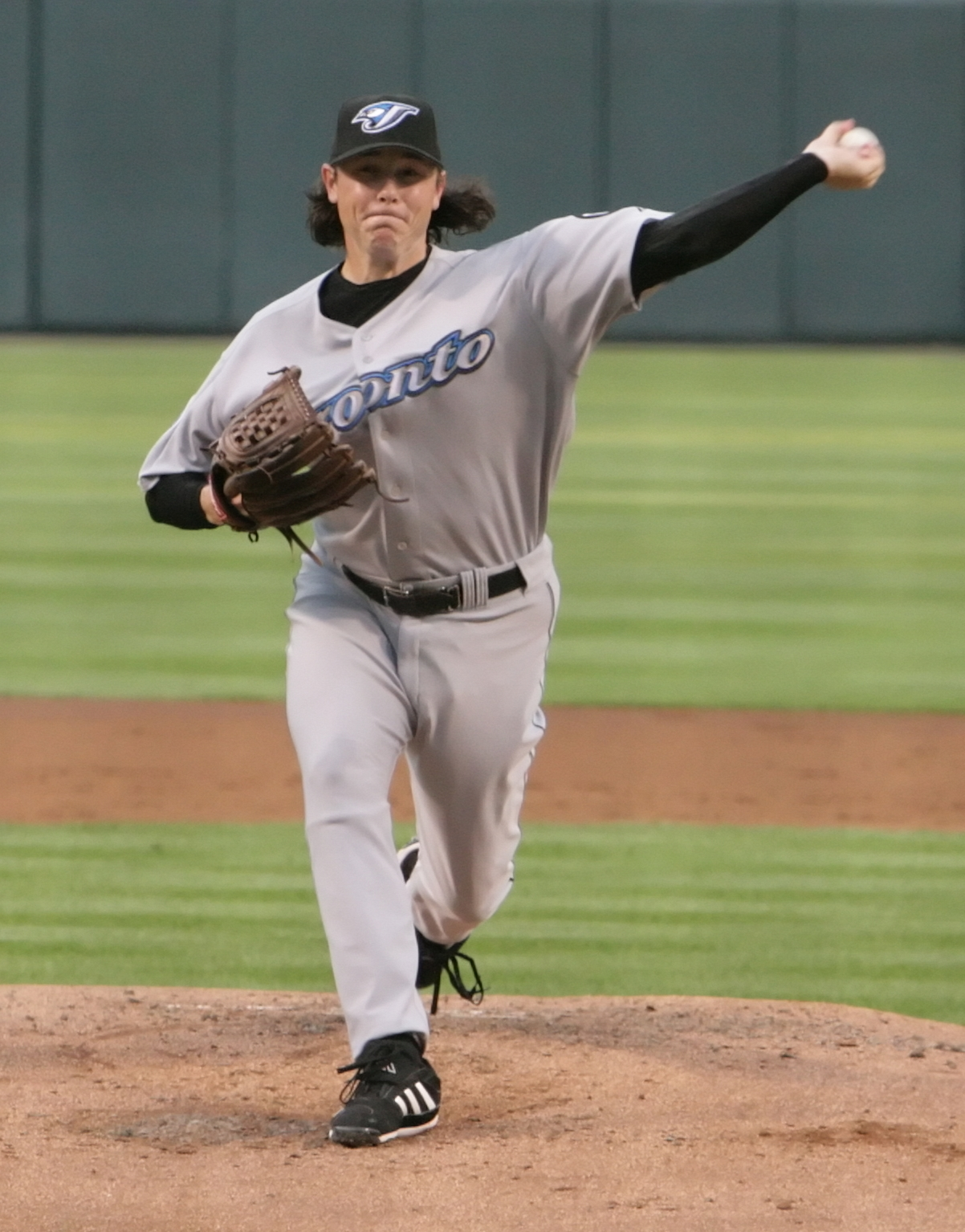
Scott Downs won the PCL Pitcher of the Year Award in 2004 after recording a no-hitter for the Edmonton Trappers on June 11.

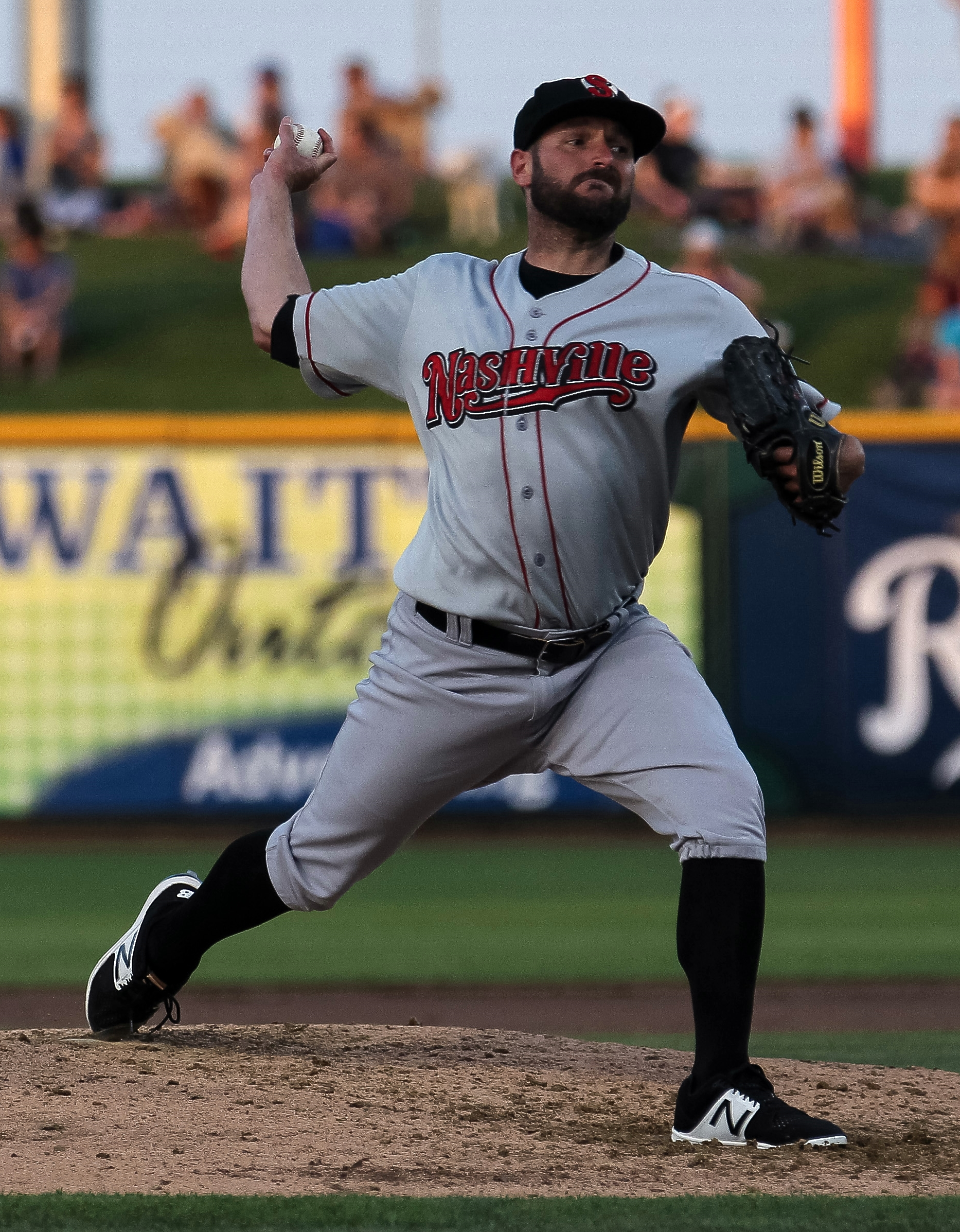
Chris Smith threw the first six innings of a combined no-hitter for the Nashville Sounds on June 7, 2017 (shown).

No-hitters
No.	Date	Pitcher(s)	Team	Score	Opponent	Location	Ref.
1	November 8, 1903	Doc Newton	Los Angeles Angels	2–0	Oakland Recruits	Chutes Park	
2	July 13, 1904	Frank Barber	San Francisco Seals	1–0	Oakland Commuters	Recreation Park	
3	April 5, 1905	Charley Hall (1)	Seattle Siwashes	8–0	Oakland Commuters	Idora Park	
4	July 16, 1905	Jimmy Whelan	San Francisco Seals	2–0 (7)	Seattle Siwashes	Recreation Park	
5	November 18, 1905	Bobby Keefe	Tacoma Tigers	3–0	Oakland Commuters	Unknown (Note: The dateline for newspaper accounts of the game indicate it was played in San Jose, California.)	
6	May 12, 1906	Charley Hall (2)	Seattle Siwashes	2–0	Oakland Commuters	Recreation Park	
7	September 2, 1906	Eli Cates (1)	Oakland Commuters	7–0	Fresno Raisin Eaters	Idora Park	
8	October 13, 1906	Fred Brown	San Francisco Seals	3–0	Oakland Commuters	Idora Park	
9	June 16, 1907	Bob Groom	Portland Beavers	1–0	Los Angeles Angels	Vaughn Street Park	
10	June 25, 1907	Eli Cates (2)	Oakland Commuters	2–1 (Note: Portland scored a run after Bill Wallace drew a walk, advanced to second base when another player was hit by a pitch, moved up to third on a sacrifice, and came home to score on a wild pitch in the seventh inning.)	Portland Beavers	Freeman's Park	
11	April 16, 1909	Elmer Koestner	Los Angeles Angels	4–0	San Francisco Seals	Recreation Park	
12	May 13, 1909	Jimmy Wiggs	Oakland Oaks	3–0	San Francisco Seals	Freeman's Park	
13	July 5, 1909	Frank Browning	San Francisco Seals	3–0	Sacramento Sacts	Oak Park	
14	July 22, 1909	Al Carson	Portland Beavers	1–0 (10)	Los Angeles Angels	Vaughn Street Park	
15	August 15, 1909	Spec Harkness	Portland Beavers	11–0 (6) (Note: The game, the second part of a doubleheader, was called after six innings to allow the teams to catch the train.)	Vernon Tigers	Vaughn Street Park	
16	August 20, 1910	Frank Miller	San Francisco Seals	3–1 (Note: Vernon scored a run after Roy Brashear drew a walk, advanced to second base when the next batter also walked, and came home to score on a throwing error in the eighth inning.)	Vernon Tigers	Recreation Park	
17	September 2, 1910	Vean Gregg	Portland Beavers	2–0	Los Angeles Angels	Vaughn Street Park	
18	October 16, 1910	Frank Arellanes	Sacramento Sacts	0–2 (8) (Note: Vernon scored two runs after three walks and two errors in the sixth inning.)	Vernon Tigers	Chutes Park	
19	April 25, 1911	Harry Suter	San Francisco Seals	1–0	Oakland Oaks	Freeman's Park	
20	June 13, 1911	Harry Ables	Oakland Oaks	2–1 (Note: Los Angeles scored a run after George Metzger drew a walk, stole second base, advanced to third on a sacrifice, and came home to score on another sacrifice in the fifth inning.)	Los Angeles Angels	Freeman's Park	
21	July 5, 1911	Ferdinand Henkel	Portland Beavers	1–0	Sacramento Sacts	Vaughn Street Park	
22	May 21, 1912	Red Toner	San Francisco Seals	2–0	Portland Beavers	Recreation Park	
23	June 30, 1912	Bill Malarkey	Oakland Oaks	0–0 (10) (Note: Malarkey allowed no hits through nine innings before allowing a double in the tenth. The game, the morning game of a doubleheader, was called and declared a tie after ten innings.)	San Francisco Seals	Freeman's Park	
24	May 18, 1913	Jack Ryan	Los Angeles Angels	6–0	Portland Beavers	Washington Park	
25	June 15, 1913	Bill James	Portland Beavers	0–0 (6) (Note: The game, the second game of a doubleheader, was called due to rain after six innings.)	Los Angeles Angels	Vaughn Street Park	
26	July 19, 1914	Roy Hitt	Venice Tigers	2–0	San Francisco Seals	Washington Park	
27	September 20, 1914	Johnny Lush	Portland Beavers	0–1 (Note: Venice scored a run after Lou Litschi reached second base on a throwing error, advanced to third on a sacrifice, and came home to score on a wild pitch in the fifth inning.)	Venice Tigers	Vaughn Street Park	
28	October 16, 1914	Rube Evans	Portland Beavers	3–0	Oakland Oaks	Oaks Park	
29	October 25, 1914	Charles Fanning (1)	San Francisco Seals	7–0	Portland Beavers	Ewing Field	
30	July 25, 1915	Bill Piercy	Vernon Tigers	3–0	Oakland Oaks	Washington Park	
31	June 4, 1916	Bill Prough	Oakland Oaks	1–0 (18) (Note: Prough allowed no hits through 10 innings before allowing a hit in the 11th. He was taken out of the game in the 17th, and Oakland scored the winning run in the 18th.)	San Francisco Seals	Oaks Park	
32	June 23, 1916	Charles Fanning (2)	San Francisco Seals	4–1 (Note: Vernon scored a run after Walt Doan drew a walk, stole second base, advanced to third on a sacrifice fly, and came home on another sac fly in the fourth inning.)	Vernon Tigers	Washington Park	
33	April 15, 1917	Chief Johnson	Vernon Tigers	6–0	Portland Beavers	Washington Park	
34	July 25, 1919	Suds Sutherland	Portland Beavers	11–0	San Francisco Seals	Recreation Park	
35	August 19, 1919	Cy Falkenberg	Oakland Oaks	6–0	Seattle Rainiers	Dugdale Park	
36	July 23, 1921	Charles Schorr	Seattle Rainiers	6–0 (6) (Note: Umpire Byron awarded the game to Seattle via forfeit after the Los Angeles battery, George Lyons and Red Baldwin, were ejected from the game for arguing over his calling of balls and strikes and then refused to leave the field.)	Los Angeles Angels	Washington Park	
37	September 21, 1922	Wheezer Dell	Vernon Tigers	7–0	Oakland Oaks	Washington Park	
38	April 14, 1923	Jim Scott	San Francisco Seals	5–0	Oakland Oaks	Oaks Park	
39	May 28, 1925	George Boehler	Oakland Oaks	0–2 (10) (Note: Boehler allowed no hits through nine innings before allowing a hit in the tenth, in which Sacramento scored two runs.)	Sacramento Senators	Oaks Park	
40	May 20, 1928	Claude Davenport	Mission Reds	4–0 (7)	Los Angeles Angels	Wrigley Field	
41	July 22, 1928	Jack Knight	Portland Beavers	5–0	Oakland Oaks	Oaks Park	
42	October 5, 1929	Herman Pillette	Mission Reds	4–0	Seattle Indians	Recreation Park	
43	May 14, 1930	Jimmy Zinn	San Francisco Seals	8–0	Sacramento Senators	Moreing Field	
44	June 6, 1931	Willie Ludolph	Oakland Oaks	4–0	Mission Reds	Seals Stadium	
45	June 12, 1931	Mal Moss	Los Angeles Angels	5–1 (Note: Sacramento scored a run after Dolph Camilli walked, advanced to second base on a wild pitch, moved up to third on a sacrifice, and came home on another sacrifice in the seventh inning.)	Sacramento Senators	Moreing Field	
46	May 5, 1932	Tony Freitas	Sacramento Senators	2–0	Oakland Oaks	Moreing Field	
47	August 18, 1933	Ed Walsh	Oakland Oaks	5–0 (7)	San Francisco Seals	Oaks Park	
48	July 4, 1937	Tiny Bonham	Oakland Oaks	2–0 (7)	Seattle Indians	Civic Stadium	
49	July 10, 1938	Joe Berry	Los Angeles Angels	4–0 (7)	Oakland Oaks	Oaks Park	
50	August 30, 1938	Dick Ward	San Diego Padres	1–0 (16) (Note: Ward allowed no hits through 12 innings before allowing a single in the 13th.)	Los Angeles Angels	Lane Field	
51	April 12, 1942	Hal Turpin	Seattle Rainiers	2–0	San Diego Padres	Lane Field	
52	May 31, 1943	Cotton Pippen^{†}	Oakland Oaks	10–0 (7)	Sacramento Solons	Moreing Field	
53	May 7, 1944	Jorge Comellas	Los Angeles Angels	2–0 (7)	San Francisco Seals	Seals Stadium	
54	July 19, 1944	Manny Salvo	Oakland Oaks	2–0	Sacramento Solons	Oaks Park	
55	April 4, 1946	Joe Demoran	Seattle Rainiers	3–0	Los Angeles Angels	Wrigley Field	
56	April 21, 1946	Ad Liska	Portland Beavers	1–0 (7)	Hollywood Stars	Vaughn Street Park	
57	May 31, 1946	Garth Mann	Sacramento Solons	6–0	Seattle Rainiers	Moreing Field	
58	April 20, 1947	Tommy Bridges	Portland Beavers	2–0	San Francisco Seals	Vaughn Street Park	
59	May 16, 1948	Dick Barrett^{†}	Seattle Rainiers	3–0 (7)	Sacramento Solons	Sick's Stadium	
60	May 27, 1951	Paul Calvert	Seattle Rainiers	4–0	Sacramento Solons	Sick's Stadium	
61	September 7, 1951	Warren Hacker	Los Angeles Angels	4–0	Seattle Rainiers	Sick's Stadium	
62	April 24, 1952	Elmer Singleton (1)	San Francisco Seals	0–1 (13) (Note: Singleton allowed no hits through 12 innings before allowing a hit in the 13th, in which Sacramento scored the winning run.)	Sacramento Solons	Seals Stadium	
63	May 1, 1952	Hal Gregg	Oakland Oaks	3–0 (7)	Portland Beavers	Oaks Park	
64	July 3, 1952	Roger Bowman (1)	Oakland Oaks	5–0	Hollywood Stars	Oaks Park	
65	June 7, 1953	Joe Hatten	Los Angeles Angels	6–0 (7)	San Diego Padres	Lane Field	
66	July 4, 1953	Red Munger	Hollywood Stars	1–0 (7)	Sacramento Solons	Gilmore Field	
67	August 25, 1953	James Atkins	Oakland Oaks	2–0 (7)	San Francisco Seals	Seals Stadium	
68	August 3, 1954	Bubba Church	Los Angeles Angels	3–0	Portland Beavers	Wrigley Field	
69	August 17, 1954	Bob Alexander	Portland Beavers	3–0 (7)	Oakland Oaks	Vaughn Street Park	
70	September 12, 1954	Roger Bowman (2)^{†}	Hollywood Stars	10–0 (7)	Portland Beavers	Vaughn Street Park	
71	July 21, 1955	George Piktuzis	Los Angeles Angels	2–1 (Note: San Francisco scored a run after Mike Baxes walked, advanced to second base on a sacrifice, moved up to third on a wild pitch, and came home on a sacrifice fly in the seventh inning.)	San Francisco Seals	Seals Stadium	
72	July 24, 1955	Elmer Singleton (2)	Seattle Rainiers	2–0 (7)	San Diego Padres	Sick's Stadium	
73	July 26, 1955	Chris Van Cuyk	Oakland Oaks	2–0 (7)	Los Angeles Angels	Oaks Park	
74	April 27, 1958	Dick Hanlon	Spokane Indians	1–0 (7)	Vancouver Mounties	Capilano Stadium	
75	June 22, 1958	Bud Watkins	Sacramento Solons	0–4 (9) (Note: Watkins allowed no hits through seven innings in the seven-inning doubleheader before allowing a hit in the ninth, in which Sacramento scored the winning run.)	Phoenix Giants	Moreing Field	
76	May 7, 1959	Russ Heman	San Diego Padres	2–0	Vancouver Mounties	Capilano Stadium	
77	May 13, 1959	George Perez	Salt Lake City Bees	7–0	Sacramento Solons	Moreing Field	
78	May 26, 1959	Dick Stigman	San Diego Padres	1–0 (15) (Note: Stigman allowed no hits through 10 innings before allowing a hit in the 11th.)	Salt Lake City Bees	Westgate Park	
79	June 20, 1959	Winston Brown	Sacramento Solons	10–0	Vancouver Mounties	Capilano Stadium	
80	August 18, 1959	Mark Freeman	Seattle Rainiers	3–0	Vancouver Mounties	Capilano Stadium	
81	July 27, 1961	Sam McDowell (1)	Salt Lake City Bees	1–0 (7)	Spokane Indians	Derks Field	
82	August 26, 1961	Al Worthington	San Diego Padres	5–0	Hawaii Islanders	Westgate Park	
83	August 14, 1962	Sammy Ellis	San Diego Padres	4–0	Tacoma Giants	Westgate Park	
84	August 26, 1962	Dick LeMay	Tacoma Giants	4–0 (7)	Vancouver Mounties	Cheney Stadium	
85	July 6, 1963	Bob Radovich	Spokane Indians	18–0	Hawaii Islanders	Fairgrounds Park	
86	August 23, 1963	Gerald Nelson	Oklahoma City 89ers	9–1 (Note: Salt Lake City scored a run after Jesse White walked, advanced to third base on a two-base throwing error, and came come on a sacrifice fly in the fourth inning.)	Salt Lake City Bees	All Sports Stadium	
87	September 1, 1963	Jerry Thomas	Tacoma Giants	1–0 (7)	Denver Bears	Cheney Stadium	
88	April 23, 1964	Bill Singer	Spokane Indians	3–0 (7)	Dallas Rangers	Burnett Field	
89	May 6, 1964	Sam McDowell (2)	Portland Beavers	8–0	Salt Lake City Bees	Multnomah Stadium	
90	June 22, 1964	Dick Estelle (1)	Tacoma Giants	2–0	Denver Bears	Cheney Stadium	
91	June 24, 1964	Jay Hook	Denver Bears	1–2 (10) (Note: Hook allowed no hits through nine innings until the tenth, in which Tacoma scored the winning run.)	Tacoma Giants	Cheney Stadium	
92	July 3, 1964	Joel Gibson	Arkansas Travelers	4–0	Dallas Rangers	Ray Winder Field	
93	August 25, 1964	Larry Yellen	Oklahoma City 89ers	0–0 (5) (Note: The game was called due to rain in the bottom of the sixth inning and the score reverted to that of the fifth. It was scheduled to be replayed as part of a doubleheader on August 26.)	Indianapolis Indians	All Sports Stadium	
94	September 9, 1964	Morrie Steevens	Arkansas Travelers	3–0	Dallas Rangers	Ray Winder Field	
95	May 11, 1965	Dick Estelle (2)	Tacoma Giants	6–0	Hawaii Islanders	Cheney Stadium	
96	May 29, 1965	Tom Kelley	Portland Beavers	5–0	Spokane Indians	Fairgrounds Park	
97	July 4, 1967	Sonny Custer	Portland Beavers	1–0 (7)	Denver Bears	Multnomah Stadium	
98	August 16, 1967	Alan Foster (1)	Spokane Indians	1–0 (7)	Seattle Angels	Sick's Stadium	
99	September 1, 1967	Alan Foster (2)	Spokane Indians	1–0	Seattle Angels	Sick's Stadium	
100	June 23, 1968	Bob Meyer	Vancouver Mounties	6–0	Hawaii Islanders	Honolulu Stadium	
101	August 18, 1968	Bo Belinsky	Hawaii Islanders	1–0	Tacoma Cubs	Honolulu Stadium	
102	September 3, 1968	Howie Reed	Oklahoma City 89ers	1–0 (7)	Indianapolis Indians	Bush Stadium	
103	June 11, 1970	Mike Jackson	Eugene Emeralds	5–0 (7)	Tucson Toros	Hi Corbett Field	
104	May 16, 1973	John D'Acquisto	Phoenix Giants	7–0 (7)	Tacoma Twins	Phoenix Municipal Stadium	
105	June 2, 1973	Dave Freisleben	Hawaii Islanders	0–1 (7) (Note: Albuquerque scored a run after Jerry Royster reached first base on a force out, advanced to third on a two-base throwing error, and came home on a wild pitch.)	Albuquerque Dukes	Honolulu Stadium	
106	August 16, 1974	Steve Dunning	Spokane Indians	10–0	Sacramento Solons	Charles C. Hughes Stadium	
107	May 19, 1975	Gary Ross^{†}	Hawaii Islanders	19–0 (5) (Note: The game was called due to rain after five innings.)	Salt Lake City Gulls	Derks Field	
108	June 21, 1975	Tom Norton	Tacoma Twins	1–0	Hawaii Islanders	Honolulu Stadium	
109	July 17, 1975	Chuck Dobson	Salt Lake City Gulls	5–0 (7)	Hawaii Islanders	Derks Field	
110	July 9, 1978	Jim Beattie	Tacoma Yankees	2–0 (7)	Spokane Indians	Fairgrounds Park	
111	April 23, 1980	Rick Rhoden	Portland Beavers	1–0 (7)	Phoenix Giants	Portland Civic Stadium	
112	July 3, 1980	Kevin Keefe	Albuquerque Dukes	0–1 (8) (Note: Keefe allowed no hits through seven innings in the seven-inning doubleheader before allowing a hit in the eighth, in which Tucson scored the winning run.)	Tucson Toros	Albuquerque Sports Stadium	
113	August 24, 1980	Larry McCall	Tacoma Tigers	1–0 (7)	Spokane Indians	Cheney Stadium	
114	April 18, 1981	Luis Tiant	Portland Beavers	2–0 (7)	Spokane Indians	Fairgrounds Park	
115	June 2, 1981	Billy Smith^{†}	Tucson Toros	4–0 (6) (Note: The game was called due to rain in the top of the seventh inning and the score reverted to that of the sixth.)	Vancouver Canadians	Nat Bailey Stadium	
116	June 13, 1981	George Stablein	Hawaii Islanders	6–1 (Note: Tacoma scored a run after Kevin Bell walked, advanced to second base after another player walked, and came home on a throwing error in the eighth inning.)	Tacoma Tigers	Aloha Stadium	
117	June 16, 1981	Rene Quinones	Vancouver Canadians	3–0 (7)	Edmonton Trappers	Nat Bailey Stadium	
118	May 4, 1983	Ricky Wright	Albuquerque Dukes	4–2 (Note: Portland scored a run on a sacrifice fly in the fifth inning and another on a wild pitch in the ninth.)	Portland Beavers	Albuquerque Sports Stadium	
119	August 20, 1983	Scott Garrelts	Phoenix Giants	1–0 (7)	Tacoma Tigers	Phoenix Municipal Stadium	
120	May 26, 1984	Juan Eichelberger	Vancouver Canadians	2–0 (7)	Portland Beavers	Portland Civic Stadium	
121	June 12, 1984	Andy Rincon	Hawaii Islanders	3–0	Tacoma Tigers	Cheney Stadium	
122	April 25, 1985	Erik Sonberg (7 IP) Steven Martin (2 IP)	Albuquerque Dukes	7–1 (Note: Hawaii scored a run after Trench Davis walked, stole second base, advanced to third on a throwing error, and came home on a ground out in the third inning.)	Hawaii Islanders	Albuquerque Sports Stadium	
123	May 2, 1985	John Henry Johnson	Hawaii Islanders	5–0	Calgary Cannons	Aloha Stadium	
124	May 14, 1985	Tim Conroy	Tacoma Tigers	1–0 (7)	Tucson Toros	Cheney Stadium	
125	May 31, 1985	Frank Wills	Calgary Cannons	1–0 (7)	Tacoma Tigers	Cheney Stadium	
126	June 20, 1985	Rick Waits	Vancouver Canadians	7–0	Portland Beavers	Nat Bailey Stadium	
127	July 24, 1987	Dave Johnson	Vancouver Canadians	3–0	Portland Beavers	Portland Civic Stadium	
128	August 14, 1987	Bill Krueger	Albuquerque Dukes	2–0 (7)	Phoenix Firebirds	Phoenix Municipal Stadium	
129	August 21, 1988	Erik Hanson	Calgary Cannons	5–0 (7)	Las Vegas Stars	Foothills Stadium	
130	May 23, 1989	Tom Drees (1)	Vancouver Canadians	1–0	Calgary Cannons	Nat Bailey Stadium	
131	May 28, 1989	Tom Drees (2)	Vancouver Canadians	1–0 (7)	Edmonton Trappers	Nat Bailey Stadium	
132	August 16, 1989	Tom Drees (3)	Vancouver Canadians	5–0 (7)	Las Vegas Stars	Nat Bailey Stadium	
133	August 20, 1989	Roger Mason (9 IP)	Tucson Toros	0–1 (11) (Note: Mason allowed no hits through nine innings before being relieved by Charlie Kerfeld to start the tenth. Las Vegas recorded their first hit off of Kerfeld in the tenth inning and scored the winning run in the eleventh.)	Las Vegas Stars	Hi Corbett Field	
134	May 6, 1990	Mike Dunne	Las Vegas Stars	2–0	Portland Beavers	Portland Civic Stadium	
135	June 10, 1991	Patrick Wernig	Tacoma Tigers	1–0	Vancouver Canadians	Cheney Stadium	
136	August 6, 1991	Jim Neidlinger	Albuquerque Dukes	3–0 (5) (Note: The game was called due to rain in the bottom of the fifth inning.)	Las Vegas Stars	Albuquerque Sports Stadium	
137	June 7, 1992	David West (6 IP) Larry Casian (2 IP) Greg Johnson (1 IP)	Portland Beavers	5–0	Vancouver Canadians	Nat Bailey Stadium	
138	September 5, 1992	Tim Worrell	Las Vegas Stars	2–0	Phoenix Firebirds	Cashman Field	
139	July 27, 1993	Ryan Hawblitzel	Colorado Springs Sky Sox	0–1 (10) (Note: Hawblitzel allowed no hits through nine innings before allowing a hit in the tenth, in which Vancouver scored the winning run.)	Vancouver Canadians	Nat Bailey Stadium	
140	May 16, 1994	Mark Petkovsek	Tucson Toros	5–0	Colorado Springs Sky Sox	Hi Corbett Field	
141	June 13, 1995	Mike Milchin	Albuquerque Dukes	2–0 (7)	Vancouver Canadians	Albuquerque Sports Stadium	
142	August 8, 1996	Aaron Small	Edmonton Trappers	6–0	Vancouver Canadians	Nat Bailey Stadium	
143	June 27, 1997	Darrell May	Vancouver Canadians	4–0 (7)	Salt Lake Buzz	Nat Bailey Stadium	
144	April 13, 1999	Terry Clark (4 IP) Bill King (4 IP) Anthony Chavez (1 IP)	Vancouver Canadians	3–0	New Orleans Zephyrs	Zephyr Field	
145	May 8, 1999	Frank Rodriguez	Salt Lake Buzz	2–1 (7) (Note: Iowa scored a run after Allen Battle reached base on an error and came home on a sacrifice fly in the first inning.)	Iowa Cubs	Sec Taylor Stadium	
146	May 1, 2001	Micah Bowie	Sacramento River Cats	3–0 (7)	Tacoma Rainiers	Cheney Stadium	
147	May 6, 2001	Brian Powell	New Orleans Zephyrs	5–0	Omaha Golden Spikes	Zephyr Field	
148	July 3, 2001	Brett Tomko	Tacoma Rainiers	7–0	Oklahoma RedHawks	SBC Bricktown Ballpark	
149	July 7, 2001	John Halama^{†}	Tacoma Rainiers	6–0	Calgary Cannons	Cheney Stadium	
150	May 14, 2002	Junior Herndon	Portland Beavers	5–0 (7)	Tacoma Rainiers	Cheney Stadium	
151	May 25, 2002	Jamie Arnold	Calgary Cannons	12–1 (Note: Iowa scored a run after Angel Echevarria reached first base on an error, advanced to second after another player walked, moved up to third when another player was hit by a pitch, and came home on a ground out.)	Iowa Cubs	Sec Taylor Stadium	
152	April 7, 2003	John Wasdin^{†}	Nashville Sounds	4–0	Albuquerque Isotopes	Herschel Greer Stadium	
153	June 13, 2003	Lindsay Gulin	Las Vegas 51s	7–0	Tacoma Rainiers	Cashman Field	
154	August 2, 2003	Chris Gissell (7 IP) Jesús Sánchez (2 IP)	Colorado Springs Sky Sox	3–0	Nashville Sounds	Herschel Greer Stadium	
155	June 11, 2004	Scott Downs	Edmonton Trappers	4–0 (7)	Las Vegas 51s	Telus Field	
156	June 9, 2006	Ryan Meaux (4 IP)^{†} Aquilino López (2 IP) Cla Meredith (1 IP)	Portland Beavers	5–0 (7)	Sacramento River Cats	Raley Field	
157	July 15, 2006	Carlos Villanueva (6 IP) Mike Meyers (2 IP) Alec Zumwalt (1 IP)	Nashville Sounds	2–0	Memphis Redbirds	Herschel Greer Stadium	
158	June 25, 2007	Manny Parra^{†}	Nashville Sounds	3–0	Round Rock Express	Dell Diamond	
159	May 11, 2008	Franklin Morales (5 IP) Chris George (1 2/3 IP) Matt Daley (1 1/3 IP) Steven Register (1 IP)	Colorado Springs Sky Sox	5–1 (Note: Albuquerque scored a run after Andrew Beattie walked, advanced to second base on a throwing error, stole third, and came home on a sacrifice fly in the fourth inning.)	Albuquerque Isotopes	Security Service Field	
160	June 29, 2008	Dustin Nippert	Oklahoma RedHawks	2–0 (7)	Omaha Royals	Johnny Rosenblatt Stadium	
161	June 30, 2009	Brandon Hynick^{†}	Colorado Springs Sky Sox	2–0 (7)	Portland Beavers	Security Service Field	
162	July 28, 2009	Sean O'Sullivan	Salt Lake Bees	2–0	Sacramento River Cats	Raley Field	
163	August 14, 2009	Luis Mendoza	Oklahoma City RedHawks	5–0	Salt Lake Bees	AT&T Bricktown Ballpark	
164	August 18, 2009	Jhoulys Chacín (5 1/3 IP) Joel Peralta (2/3 IP) Juan Rincón (2 IP) Randy Flores (1 IP)	Colorado Springs Sky Sox	5–0	Oklahoma City RedHawks	AT&T Bricktown Ballpark	
165	May 7, 2014	Chris Rusin	Iowa Cubs	3–0	New Orleans Zephyrs	Zephyr Field	
166	April 14, 2017	Scott Copeland (7 IP) Hunter Cervenka (1 IP) Brandon Cunniff (1 IP)	New Orleans Baby Cakes	11–1 (Note: Iowa scored after Todd Glaesmann walked, advanced to second base on a throwing error, moved up to third when another player walked, and came home on a fielding error in the eighth inning.)	Iowa Cubs	Principal Park	
167	June 7, 2017	Chris Smith (6 IP) Sean Doolittle (1 IP) Tucker Healy (1 IP) Simón Castro (1 IP)	Nashville Sounds	4–0	Omaha Storm Chasers	Werner Park	
168	July 3, 2021	Luke Westphal	El Paso Chihuahuas	16–0 (5) (Note: The game was called due to rain in the top of the sixth inning.)	Albuquerque Isotopes	Isotopes Park	
169	September 3, 2021	Norwith Gudino (4 IP) Conner Menez (3 IP) Tyler Cyr (1 IP) Trevor Gott (1 IP)	Sacramento River Cats	4–0	Salt Lake Bees	Sutter Health Park	

== No-hitters by team ==
Active Pacific Coast League teams appear in bold.

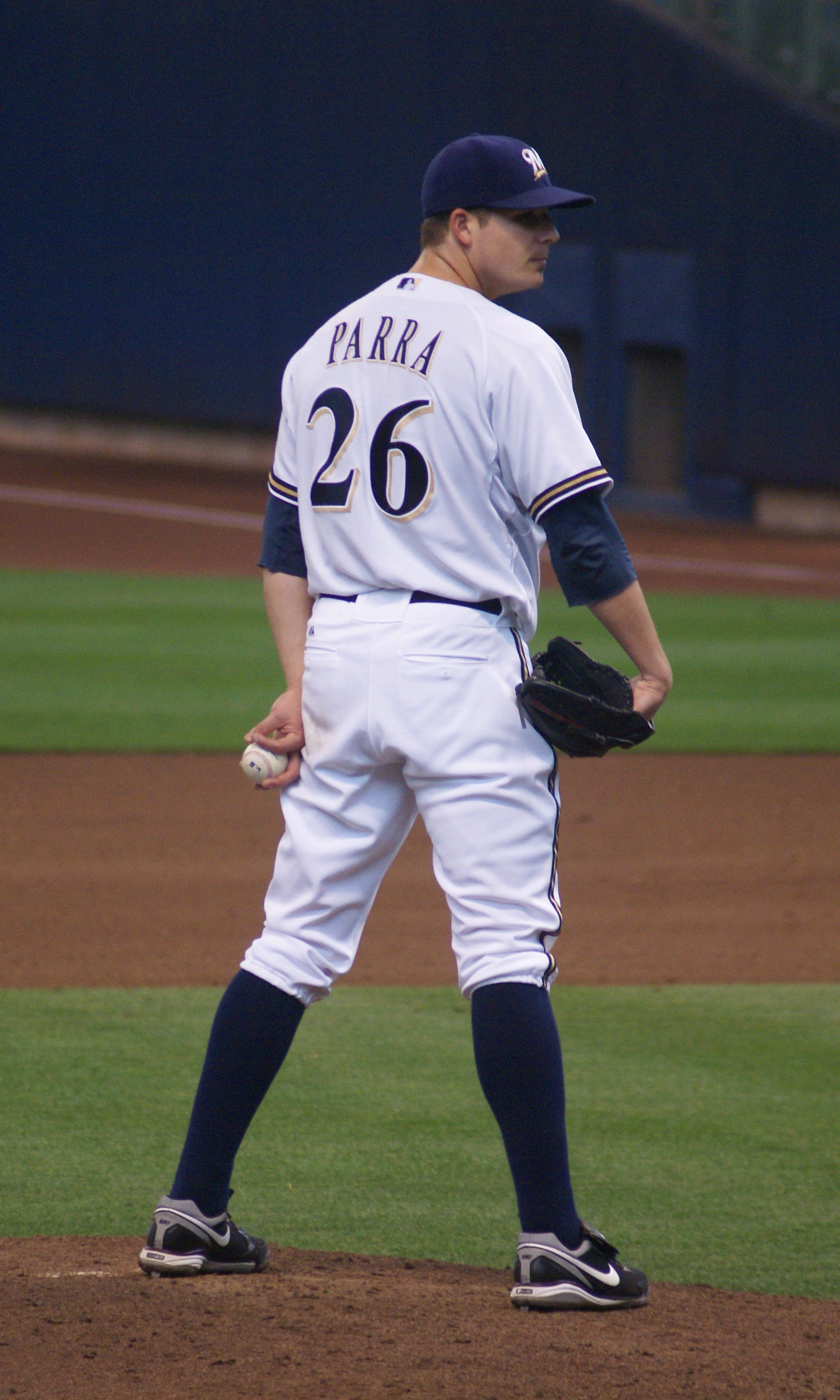
Manny Parra became the second Nashville Sounds pitcher to throw a nine-inning perfect game when he threw the league's third on June 25, 2007.

Team	No-hitters	Perfect games
Portland Beavers	21	1
Oakland Oaks (Oakland Commuters)	17	1
**Tacoma Rainiers** (Tacoma Tigers/Giants/Twins/Yankees)	12	1
San Francisco Seals	12	0
Los Angeles Angels	10	0
Seattle Rainiers (Seattle Siwashes)	9	1
Vancouver Canadians	9	0
Hawaii Islanders	6	1
Albuquerque Dukes	6	0
Spokane Indians	6	0
Colorado Springs Sky Sox	5	1
**Oklahoma City Comets** (Oklahoma City 89ers/RedHawks/Dodgers)	5	0
Sacramento Solons (Sacramento Sacts/Senators)	5	0
San Diego Padres	5	0
Nashville Sounds	4	2
Vernon Tigers (Venice Tigers)	4	0
Tucson Toros	3	1
Calgary Cannons	3	0
**Las Vegas Aviators** (Las Vegas Stars/51s)	3	0
Salt Lake City Bees (Salt Lake City Gulls)	3	0
Hollywood Stars	2	1
Arkansas Travelers	2	0
Edmonton Trappers	2	0
Mission Reds	2	0
New Orleans Baby Cakes (New Orleans Zephyrs)	2	0
Phoenix Giants	2	0
**Sacramento River Cats**	2	0
**Salt Lake Bees** (Salt Lake Buzz)	2	0
Denver Bears	1	0
**El Paso Chihuahuas**	1	0
Eugene Emeralds	1	0
Iowa Cubs	1	0
Vancouver Mounties	1	0
**Totals**	169	10

== See also ==
- List of American Association no-hitters
- List of International League no-hitters
