= List of Oakland Oaks no-hitters =

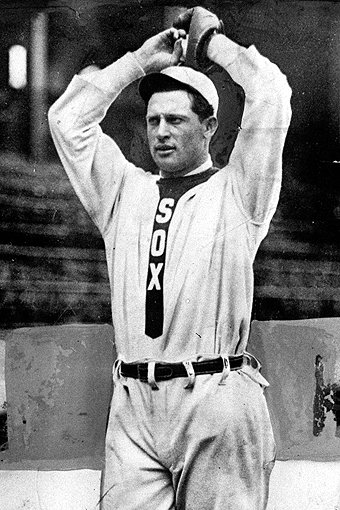
Hall of Famer Ed Walsh threw a no-hitter for the Oaks on August 18, 1933.

The following is a list of no-hitters by the Pacific Coast League (PCL) baseball club the Oakland Oaks (originally called the Oakland Commuters). The Oaks were one of the five charter teams of the PCL, established in 1903. During their run, from 1903 to 1940 and 1942 to 1955, the team recorded 17 no-hitters. One no-hitter was a perfect game. In total, sixteen pitchers threw no-hitters for the team, with Eli Cates credited with two, including the first in franchise history.

== No-hitters ==
Key
Score	Game score with no-hitter team's runs listed first
Location	Stadium in italics denotes a no-hitter thrown in a home game.
Score (#)	A number following a score indicates number of innings in a game that was shorter or longer than 9 innings.
Pitcher (#)	A number following a pitcher's name indicates multiple no-hitters thrown.
IP	Innings pitched
†	Indicates a perfect game

No-hitters
No.	Date	Pitcher(s)	Score	Opponent	Location	Notes	Ref.
1	September 2, 1906	Eli Cates (1)	7–0	Fresno Raisin Eaters	Idora Park		
2	June 25, 1907	Eli Cates (2)	2–1	Portland Beavers	Freeman's Park	Portland scored a run after Bill Wallace drew a walk, advanced to second base when another player was hit by a pitch, moved up to third on a sacrifice, and came home to score on a wild pitch in the seventh inning.	
3	May 13, 1909	Jimmy Wiggs	3–0	San Francisco Seals	Freeman's Park		
4	June 13, 1911	Harry Ables	2–1	Los Angeles Angels	Freeman's Park	Los Angeles scored a run after George Metzger drew a walk, stole second base, advanced to third on a sacrifice, and came home to score on another sacrifice in the fifth inning.	
5	June 30, 1912	Bill Malarkey	0–0 (10)	San Francisco Seals	Freeman's Park	Malarkey allowed no hits through nine innings before allowing a double in the tenth. The game, the morning game of a doubleheader, was called and declared a tie after ten innings.	
6	June 4, 1916	Bill Prough	1–0 (18)	San Francisco Seals	Oaks Park	Prough allowed no hits through 10 innings before allowing a hit in the 11th. He was taken out of the game in the 17th, and Oakland scored the winning run in the 18th.	
7	August 19, 1919	Cy Falkenberg	6–0	Seattle Rainiers	Dugdale Park		
8	May 28, 1925	George Boehler	0–2 (10)	Sacramento Senators	Oaks Park	Boehler allowed no hits through nine innings before allowing a hit in the tenth, in which Sacramento scored two runs.	
9	June 6, 1931	Willie Ludolph	4–0	Mission Reds	Seals Stadium		
10	August 18, 1933	Ed Walsh	5–0 (7)	San Francisco Seals	Oaks Park		
11	July 4, 1937	Tiny Bonham	2–0 (7)	Seattle Indians	Civic Stadium		
12	May 31, 1943	Cotton Pippen^{†}	10–0 (7)	Sacramento Solons	Moreing Field		
13	July 19, 1944	Manny Salvo	2–0	Sacramento Solons	Oaks Park		
14	May 1, 1952	Hal Gregg	3–0 (7)	Portland Beavers	Oaks Park		
15	July 3, 1952	Roger Bowman (1)	5–0	Hollywood Stars	Oaks Park		
16	August 25, 1953	James Atkins	2–0 (7)	San Francisco Seals	Seals Stadium		
17	July 26, 1955	Chris Van Cuyk	2–0 (7)	Los Angeles Angels	Oaks Park		

== See also ==
- List of Pacific Coast League no-hitters
