= Lists of no-hitters =

The following are lists of no-hitters in baseball:

== Major leagues ==
- List of Major League Baseball no-hitters
  - List of Arizona Diamondbacks no-hitters
  - List of Atlanta Braves no-hitters
  - List of Baltimore Orioles no-hitters
  - List of Boston Red Sox no-hitters
  - List of Chicago Cubs no-hitters
  - List of Chicago White Sox no-hitters
  - List of Cincinnati Reds no-hitters
  - List of Cleveland Guardians no-hitters
  - List of Colorado Rockies no-hitters
  - List of Detroit Tigers no-hitters
  - List of Houston Astros no-hitters
  - List of Kansas City Royals no-hitters
  - List of Los Angeles Angels no-hitters
  - List of Los Angeles Dodgers no-hitters
  - List of Miami Marlins no-hitters
  - List of Milwaukee Brewers no-hitters
  - List of Minnesota Twins no-hitters
  - List of New York Mets no-hitters
  - List of New York Yankees no-hitters
  - List of Oakland Athletics no-hitters
  - List of Philadelphia Phillies no-hitters
  - List of Pittsburgh Pirates no-hitters
  - List of San Diego Padres no-hitters
  - List of San Francisco Giants no-hitters
  - List of Seattle Mariners no-hitters
  - List of St. Louis Cardinals no-hitters
  - List of Tampa Bay Rays no-hitters
  - List of Texas Rangers no-hitters
  - List of Toronto Blue Jays no-hitters
  - List of Washington Nationals no-hitters
- List of Negro league baseball no-hitters

=== Perfect games ===
- List of Major League Baseball perfect games

== Other international leagues ==
- List of Nippon Professional Baseball no-hitters
- List of KBO League no-hitters

=== Perfect games ===
- List of Nippon Professional Baseball perfect games

== Minor leagues ==
- List of American Association no-hitters
- List of International League no-hitters
- List of Pacific Coast League no-hitters

=== By franchise ===
- List of Rochester Red Wings no-hitters
- List of San Francisco Seals no-hitters
- List of Toronto Maple Leafs no-hitters
- List of Nashville Sounds no-hitters
- List of Nashville Vols no-hitters
- List of Oakland Oaks no-hitters

== See also ==
- A (possibly incomplete) list of All-American Girls Professional Baseball League no-hitters
