= List of Nashville Sounds no-hitters =

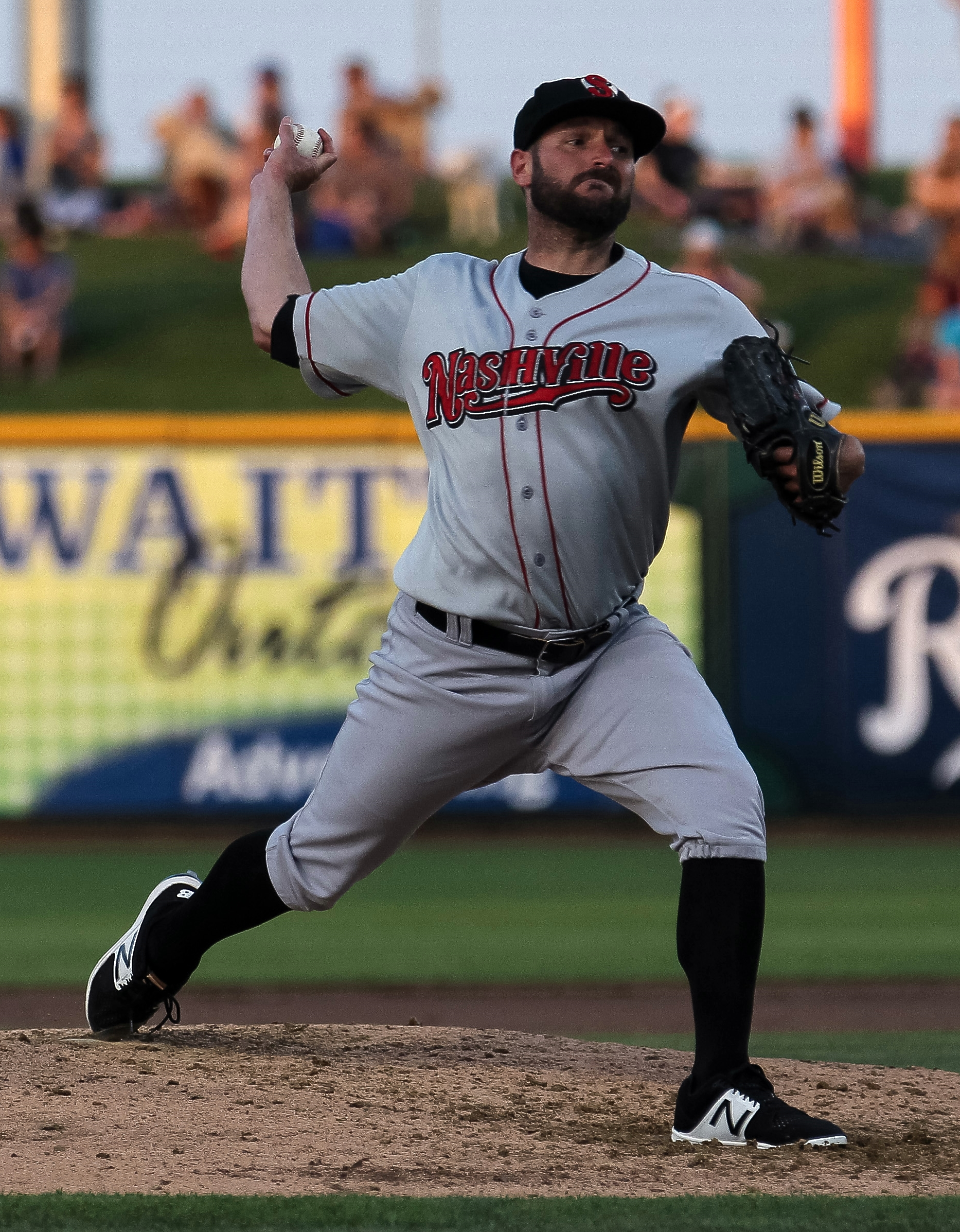
Chris Smith pitched the first six innings of Nashville's seventh no-hitter on June 7, 2017 (shown).

Since the Nashville Sounds Minor League Baseball team was established in Nashville, Tennessee, in 1978, its pitchers have pitched nine no-hitters, three of which were perfect games. A no-hit game occurs when a pitcher (or pitchers) allows no hits over the course of a game. A perfect game, a much rarer feat, occurs when no batters reach base by a hit or any other means, such as a walk, hit by pitch, or error.

Nashville's nine no-hitters were accomplished by a total of 15 pitchers. Six were complete games pitched by a lone pitcher, and three were combined no-hitters. One occurred while the team was a member of the Double-A Southern League, and eight have been pitched at the Triple-A level: two in the American Association, four in the Pacific Coast League, and two in the International League. Five were pitched at the Sounds' first home ballpark, Herschel Greer Stadium, where the team played from 1978 to 2014. None have been pitched at First Horizon Park, the team's home since 2015. Four were pitched in road games.

== History ==
The Nashville Sounds' first no-hitter was Jim Deshaies' 5–1 win over the Columbus Astros on May 4, 1984, at Herschel Greer Stadium in Nashville, Tennessee. In the second inning, Deshaies walked two batters and hit another, loading the bases for Ty Gainey, who hit into a fielder's choice that allowed Mark Strucher to score the Astros' only run of the game, the second part of a seven-inning doubleheader. Deshaies struck out eight batters including Gainey for the final out. Their second no-hitter was thrown by Bryan Kelly on July 17, 1985, against the Oklahoma City 89ers at Greer Stadium. The no-hit bid was nearly broken up in the eighth inning when Nick Capra executed a swinging bunt down the first base line, but first baseman Mike Laga fielded the ball and tossed it to Kelly who rushed to step on first for the out.

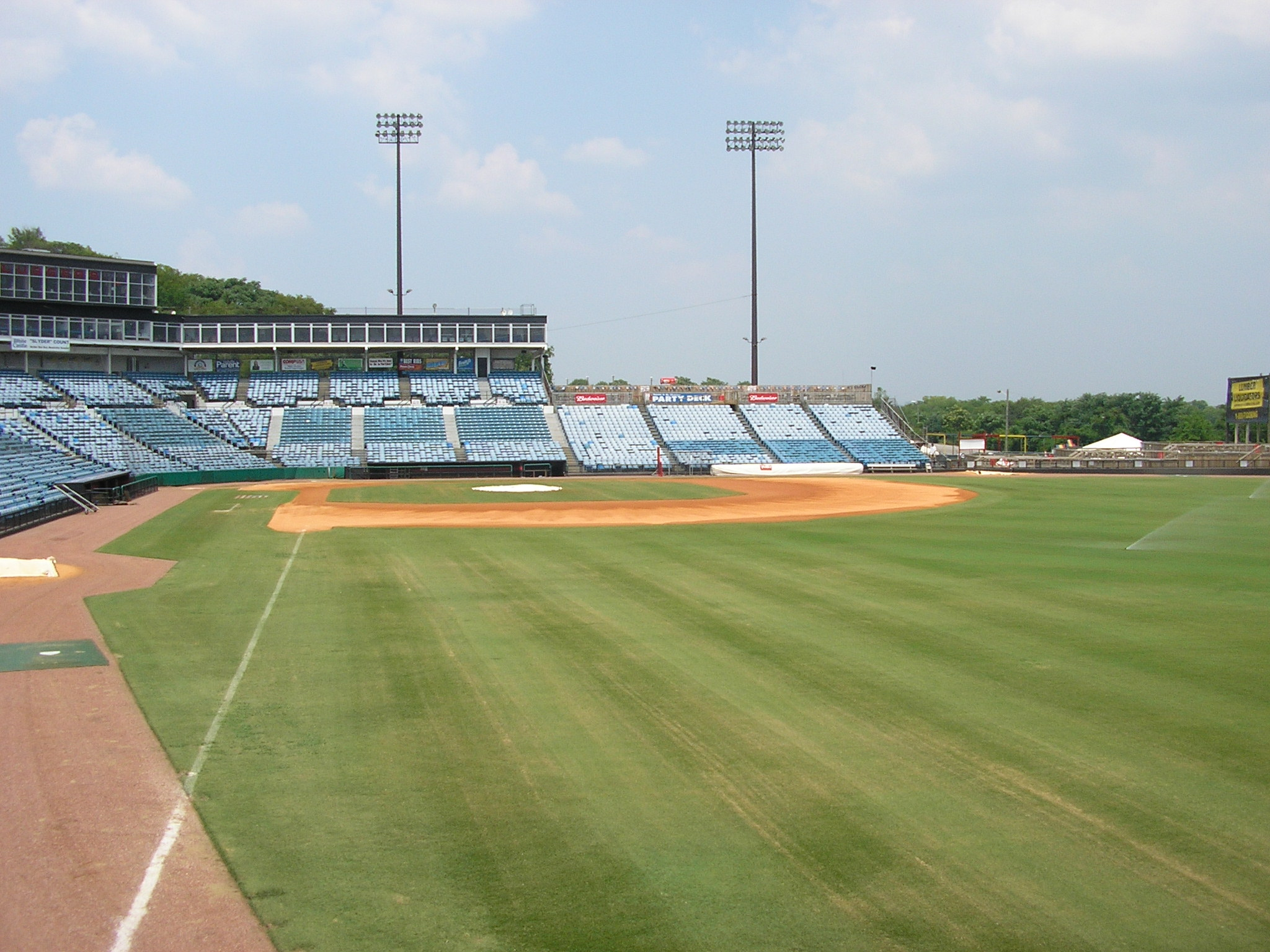
Five of the Sounds' no-hitters occurred at Herschel Greer Stadium in Nashville.

Jack Armstrong tossed the club's third no-hitter on August 7, 1988, versus the Indianapolis Indians in Nashville. He finished one base runner shy of perfection after Razor Shines reached on a walk in the fourth inning. Second baseman Lenny Harris backed-up Armstrong in the fifth when he ran down a sharply-hit grounder and made an off-balance throw to get Jack Daugherty out at first. Harris also made significant contributions to the previous night's game in which Indians pitchers Randy Johnson and Pat Pacillo pitched a no-hit game against the Sounds, but lost. That game was won by Nashville when Harris walked to first base, stole second base, stole third base, and then came home, scoring on a groundout.

John Wasdin pitched a perfect game against the Albuquerque Isotopes at Greer on April 7, 2003. Third baseman Mike Gulan made two critical defensive plays to keep the perfect game bid intact. The first was the barehanded-fielding of Jesus Medrano's bunt in the top of the fourth inning, which he threw to first baseman Adam Hyzdu to get Medrano out by a step. The other came in the top of the ninth as Gulan made a backhanded catch of Matt Treanor's sharply-hit line drive for the inning's first out. Only the next-to-last hitter, Matt Erickson, worked the count full before striking out swinging on a curveball. Wasdin completed the game by striking out the final batter, pinch hitter Rob Stratton. In all, Wasdin threw 100 pitches, striking out 15 batters. This was the second nine-inning complete perfect game in Pacific Coast League history.

The Sounds' first combined no-hitter occurred on July 15, 2006, in Nashville, when pitchers Carlos Villanueva (6 IP), Mike Meyers (2 IP), and Alec Zumwalt (1 IP) no-hit the Memphis Redbirds. Memphis came close to scoring in the top of the third inning when Skip Schumaker drew a leadoff walk, advanced to second base on a sacrifice bunt, and reached third on a fly out, but Villanueva struck out Jason Conti to retire the side. Working under a limit of 90 pitches in his Triple-A debut, Villanueva was relieved by Meyers at the start of the seventh inning, and Zumwalt came in for the save in the ninth, working a 1-2-3 inning and striking out Conti on a checked swing for the final out.

Manny Parra pitched the franchise's second perfect game on June 25, 2007, against the Round Rock Express at the Dell Diamond in Round Rock, Texas, making it the first Sounds no-hitter in a road game. Only two Express players managed to work the count full: Jason Lane and Cody Ransom. Otherwise, Parra experienced little difficulty in retiring hitters. The last batter of the game was pinch hitter Jesse Garcia, who popped out to Brad Nelson at first. Parra threw 107 pitches and struck out 11 hitters to record the third nine-inning complete perfect game in Pacific Coast League history.

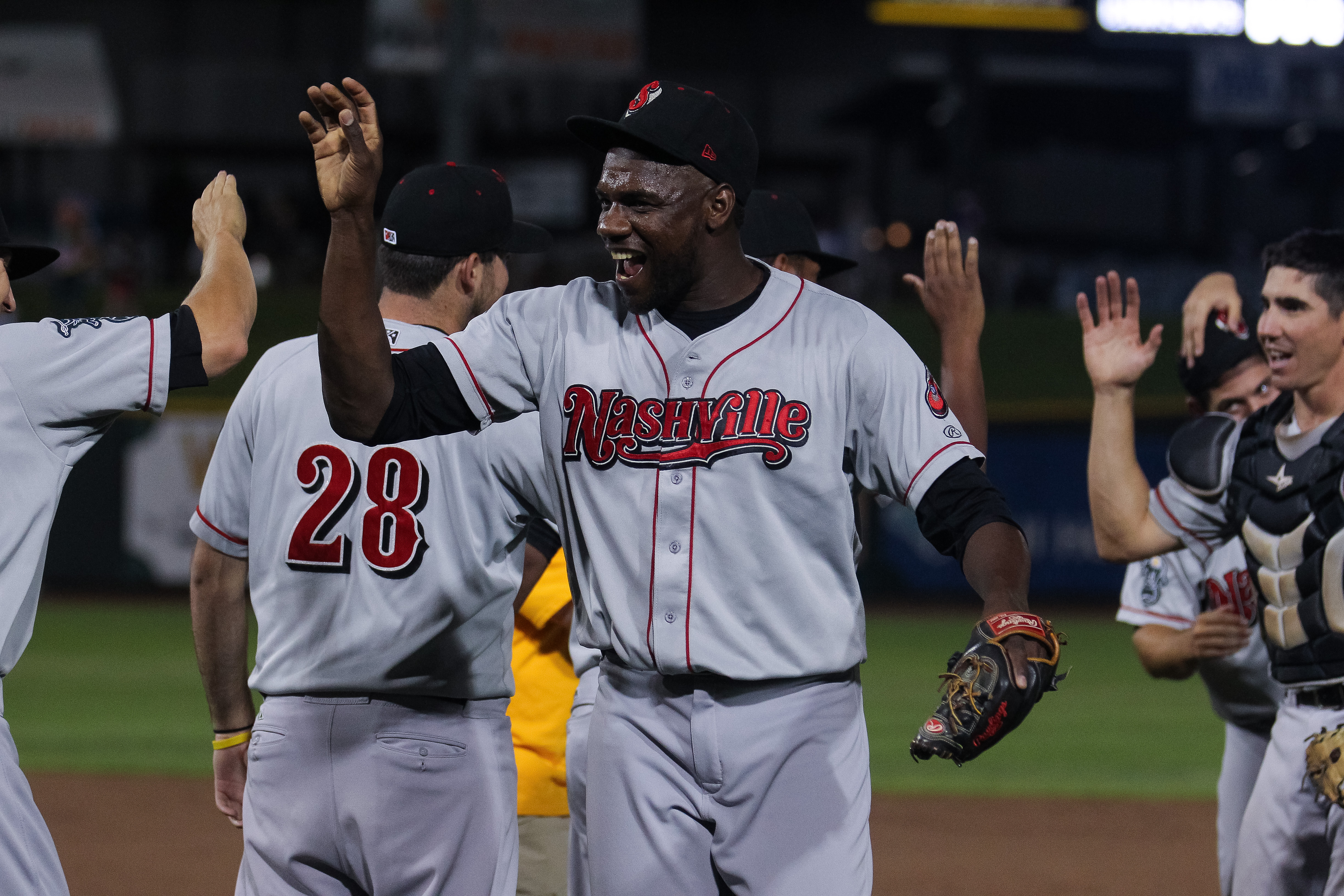
Simón Castro celebrating with his Sounds teammates after closing out a no-hitter on June 7, 2017.

Nashville's next no-hit effort occurred on June 7, 2017, when Chris Smith (6 IP), Sean Doolittle (1 IP), Tucker Healy (1 IP), and Simón Castro (1 IP) pitched a combined no-hitter versus the Omaha Storm Chasers at Werner Park in Papillion, Nebraska. The 36-year-old Smith pitched six scoreless innings before being relieved by a trio of pitchers including Doolittle, who was with the team on a major league rehab assignment.

Sounds pitchers accomplished two no-hitters, one of them a perfect game, late in the 2026 season. On August 23, Brandon Sproat (3 IP) and Tate Kuehner (4 IP) combined to no-hit the Norfolk Tides in the first game of a seven-inning doubleheader at Harbor Park in Norfolk, Virginia. With two on in the bottom of the seventh inning following a walk and a hit by pitch, outfielder Tyler Black made a leaping catch at the wall to secure the victory.

On September 7, fifteen days later, Thomas Pannone pitched the Sounds' third perfect game against the Durham Bulls at Durham Bulls Athletic Park in Durham, North Carolina. Three batters came close to drawing walks with three-ball counts, including the final hitter, Homer Bush Jr., who grounded out to shortstop Eduardo Garcia, who threw the ball to Blake Burke at first for the final out. In all, Pannone threw 94 pitches, the fewest needed in Nashville's three perfect games, striking out eight batters. This was the fifth nine-inning complete perfect game in International League history.

== No-hitters ==
Key
Score	Game score with Sounds runs listed first
BR	Number of base runners by the opposing team
(#)	Number of innings in a game that was shorter or longer than 9 innings
£	Pitcher was left-handed
†	Perfect game

No-hitters
No.	Date	Pitcher(s)	Score	BR	Opponent	Location	Catcher	Notes	Ref.
1	May 4, 1984	Jim Deshaies^{£}	5–1 (7)	5	Columbus Astros	Herschel Greer Stadium	Bill Lindsey	First Sounds no-hitter; First Sounds no-hitter at Herschel Greer Stadium; Only Sounds Double-A and Southern League no-hitter; Second game of a doubleheader	
2	July 17, 1985	Bryan Kelly	6–0	6	Oklahoma City 89ers	Herschel Greer Stadium	Dwight Lowry	First Sounds Triple-A no-hitter; First Sounds American Association no-hitter; Largest margin of victory in a Sounds no-hitter (6 runs)	
3	August 7, 1988	Jack Armstrong	4–0	1	Indianapolis Indians	Herschel Greer Stadium	Terry McGriff	Last Sounds American Association no-hitter; Occurred one night after being no-hit by Indianapolis	
4	April 7, 2003	John Wasdin^{†}	4–0	0	Albuquerque Isotopes	Herschel Greer Stadium	Humberto Cota	First Sounds perfect game; First Sounds Pacific Coast League no-hitter; Longest interval between Sounds no-hitters (14 years and 8 months)	
5	July 15, 2006	Carlos Villanueva (6 IP) Mike Meyers (2 IP) Alec Zumwalt (1 IP)	2–0	3	Memphis Redbirds	Herschel Greer Stadium	Chad Moeller	First Sounds combined no-hitter; Last Sounds no-hitter at Herschel Greer Stadium; Smallest margin of victory in a Sounds no-hitter (tie; 2 runs)	
6	June 25, 2007	Manny Parra^{£†}	3–0	0	Round Rock Express	Dell Diamond	Mike Rivera	First Sounds no-hitter in a road game	
7	June 7, 2017	Chris Smith (6 IP) Sean Doolittle^{£} (1 IP) Tucker Healy (1 IP) Simón Castro (1 IP)	4–0	3	Omaha Storm Chasers	Werner Park	Matt McBride	Last Sounds Pacific Coast League no-hitter; Most pitchers used in a Sounds no-hitter (4)	
8	August 23, 2026	Brandon Sproat (3 IP) Tate Kuehner^{£} (4 IP)	2–0 (7)	2	Norfolk Tides	Harbor Park	Jeferson Quero	First Sounds International League no-hitter; First game of a doubleheader; Smallest margin of victory in a Sounds no-hitter (tie; 2 runs)	
9	September 7, 2026	Thomas Pannone^{£†}	3–0	0	Durham Bulls	Durham Bulls Athletic Park	Ramón Rodríguez	Shortest interval between Sounds no-hitters (15 days); Most recent Sounds no-hitter (20 days ago)	

== See also ==
- List of American Association no-hitters
- List of International League no-hitters
- List of Pacific Coast League no-hitters
- List of Southern League no-hitters
