= Tom Drees =

American baseball player (born 1963)

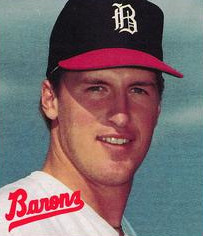
- Drees in 1988
- Pitcher
- Born: June 17, 1963 (age 62); Des Moines, Iowa, U.S.
- Batted: Switch Threw: Left

MLB debut
- September 3, 1991, for the Chicago White Sox

Last MLB appearance
- October 5, 1991, for the Chicago White Sox

MLB statistics
- Win–loss record: 0-0
- Earned run average: 12.27
- Strikeouts: 2
- Stats at Baseball Reference

Teams
- Chicago White Sox (1991)

Career highlights and awards
- Pitched three no-hitters for the Vancouver Canadians, 1989

Thomas Kent Drees (born June 17, 1963) is an American former Major League Baseball pitcher. He appeared in four games for the Chicago White Sox in 1991, all as a reliever.

== Career ==
Drees attended Creighton University, and in 1984 he played collegiate summer baseball with the Chatham A's of the Cape Cod Baseball League. He was selected by the White Sox in the 17th round of the 1985 MLB draft.

Drees made headlines in 1989 while pitching for the Vancouver Canadians. During that season, Drees pitched three no-hitters, including two consecutive ones on May 23 and May 28 (the latter of which was only seven innings). Overall, Drees won 12 games for Vancouver with a 3.37 ERA. He made his major league debut as a September call-up with the White Sox in 1991, and appeared in four major league games.
