= Vernon Tigers =

- 1909–1925; Vernon, California

Minor league affiliations
- Previous classes: Double-A (1909–1925)
- League: Pacific Coast League (1909–1925)

Major league affiliations
- Previous teams: None

Minor league titles
- League titles: 1919, 1920

Team data
- Previous names: Vernon Tigers (1909–1912, 1915–1925); Venice Tigers (1913–1914)
- Previous parks: Maier Park; Chutes Park; Washington Park

The Vernon Tigers were a Minor League Baseball team that represented Vernon, California in the Pacific Coast League (PCL) from 1909 to 1925. The team won back-to-back PCL pennants in 1919 and 1920. The Tigers, together with the Sacramento Solons, joined the PCL as a new team in 1909 when the league expanded from six teams to eight. The Tigers effectively were a second team in Los Angeles, rivals of the existing Los Angeles Angels.

== History ==
Vernon, California, was and still is a small community in Los Angeles County. Vernon fielded a PCL team because it was one of only two cities in Los Angeles County where the sale and consumption of alcohol was legal. Vernon used its "wet" distinction to its advantage. The largest enterprise in the town at the time was Doyle's bar, advertised as the "longest bar in the world" with 37 bartenders. Doyle was also a sports promoter, building an arena where world championship boxing matches were held. Tigers owner Pete Maier built Maier Park next to Doyle's bar, which had its own entrance to the park.

In 1913, 1914 and part of 1915, the Tigers relocated to the oceanside community of Venice, and were known as the Venice Tigers during those seasons. Not coincidentally, Venice was the only other "wet" city in Los Angeles County. On Sundays and special holidays in which alcohol sales were not permitted, the Tigers played their home games at Washington Park, which was primarily the Angels' home field. The team did not draw well in Venice, and the Tigers moved back to Vernon in July of 1915. Player-manager Happy Hogan, who had managed the team since 1909 (such that the newspapers sometimes called the team "Hogan's Tigers") died in May of the 1915 season, of pneumonia.

Vernon Tigers uniforms

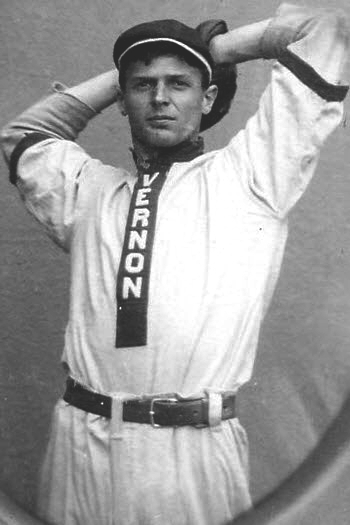
Al Carson donning the 1911 Tigers home uniform with "Vernon" vertically affixed to the placket of the shirt.

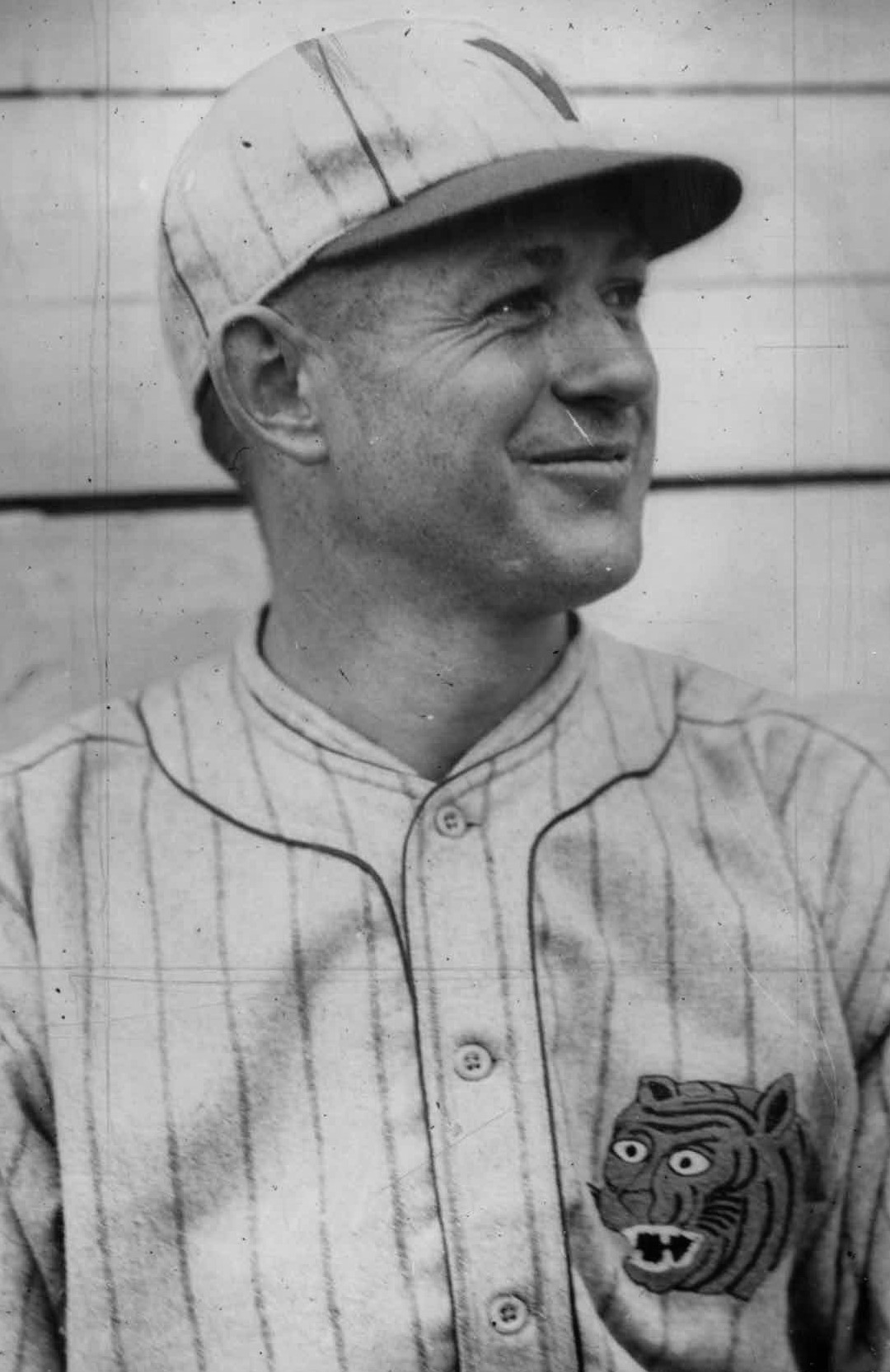
Jakie May is photographed during the 1922 season wearing Vernon's pinstriped uniforms featuring a tiger on the left breast.

Bob Meusel, later a New York Yankees teammate of Babe Ruth, played for Vernon in 1917 before serving in World War I the following year with the Navy. The Tigers finished the war-shortened 1918 season in first place; however, they were defeated by the Los Angeles Angels in a postseason series. This postseason series is often incorrectly identified as a "playoff." That postseason series, however, was unrelated to the PCL playoff system which was established some years later.

In early 1919, team owner Edward R. Maier (1883-1943) sold a controlling interest in the Tigers to movie actor Roscoe "Fatty" Arbuckle, a superstar in the silent film era. When the team became known as the Hollywood Stars, Hollywood began taking a collective notice of the team as a result of Arbuckle's ownership. And, the season concluded with the Tigers defeating the rival Angels in the last series of the season, winning the pennant by 1 1/2 games.

The 1919 season became infamous for the "Black Sox" scandal. As with the tainted World Series of that year, there were rumors that opposing PCL players had been bribed to "throw" games against the Tigers. League President William McCarthy expelled Tiger first baseman Babe Borton and several other players under suspicion of involvement.

The Tigers seemed unfazed by the scandal, as they finished first for the third year in a row, winning the 1920 pennant by 5 1/2 games over the Seattle Indians. However, that was the beginning of end of the team. The Eighteenth Amendment had been ratified, criminalizing the production and sale of alcohol everywhere in the U.S., including Vernon. It took effect in 1920. The small population of Vernon became a liability, as fewer Angelenos were willing to travel the distance to watch a game in a "dry" town.

Moreover, principal owner Arbuckle had found ownership of the team more work than he had bargained for, and sold his interest in the team. Ed Maier resumed operation of the club late in 1919. With Arbuckle's departure, the Hollywood crowd lost interest in the Tigers. As attendance waned, the caliber of play did also, and the team struggled in its final years.

In 1921, William Wrigley Jr., owner of the Chicago Cubs, bought controlling interest in the Angels. A power struggle between the owners of the Angels and the Tigers began. The Tigers had played most of their home games at Washington Park, renting from its owners as had the Angels. Late in 1925, Wrigley opened a new ballpark of his own, Wrigley Field, and immediately announced that Tigers owner Ed Maier and his ball club were not welcome in the new park. That was a death-blow to the Vernon franchise, and Maier sold both the ball club and Maier Park to San Francisco interests. The Tigers moved to that city to begin play in 1926 as the Mission Reds.

Wrigley still wanted rental income for days when the Angels were playing road games, so he invited his friend Bill "Hardpan" Lane to move the Salt Lake City Bees to play at Wrigley Field in 1926. The transferred Bees became the first incarnation of the Hollywood Stars, playing their games at Wrigley through the 1935 season, then transferring again, to become the San Diego Padres.

After 12 unprofitable seasons in San Francisco, the Mission team moved back to Los Angeles for the 1938 season. They were renamed as the second incarnation of the Hollywood Stars, and established a strong rivalry with the Angels that lasted until the arrival of the Brooklyn Dodgers in 1958. As before in Los Angeles for a time, and as in San Francisco, the Stars found themselves being tenants of the more dominant team in the city. However, the Stars would soon build their own park and achieve a measure of success that the Tigers and the Missions had been unable to.

== See also ==
- Vernon Arena
