= Al Carson =

American baseball player (1882–1962)

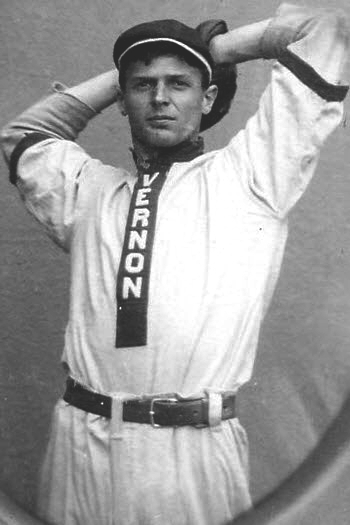
- Pitcher
- Born: August 22, 1882; Chicago, Illinois
- Died: November 26, 1962 (aged 80); San Diego, California
- Batted: Right Threw: Right

MLB debut
- May 6, 1910, for the Chicago Cubs

Last MLB appearance
- May 12, 1910, for the Chicago Cubs

MLB statistics
- Win–loss record: 0-0
- Earned run average: 4.05
- Strikeouts: 2
- Stats at Baseball Reference

Teams
- Chicago Cubs (1910)

Albert James "Soldier" Carson (August 22, 1882 – November 26, 1962) was a professional baseball player who played pitcher in the Major Leagues in 1910. He played for the Chicago Cubs.
