= Frank Miller (pitcher) =

American baseball player (1886–1974)

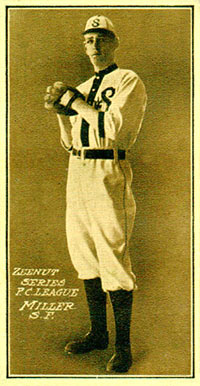
- Pitcher
- Born: May 13, 1886; Allegan, Michigan, U.S.
- Died: February 19, 1974 (aged 87); Allegan, Michigan, U.S.
- Batted: Right Threw: Right

MLB debut
- July 12, 1913, for the Chicago White Sox

Last MLB appearance
- July 30, 1923, for the Boston Braves

MLB statistics
- Win–loss record: 52–66
- Strikeouts: 359
- Earned run average: 3.01
- Stats at Baseball Reference

Teams
- Chicago White Sox (1913); Pittsburgh Pirates (1916–1919); Boston Braves (1922–1923)

Frank Lee Miller (May 13, 1886 – February 19, 1974), a.k.a. "Bullet", was 27 years old when he entered the professional baseball scene on July 12, 1913, with the Chicago White Sox.

Miller pitched only one game in the 1913 season, taking a loss. He returned to the Majors with the Pittsburgh Pirates in 1916, where he pitched an average of 30 games a year through the 1919 season.

He again left the scene for the 1920–21 seasons, but returned to the field again in 1922, this time wearing the uniform of the Boston Braves.

He played his last major league game on July 30, 1923.

He died on February 19, 1974, aged 87, in his hometown, Allegan, Michigan and was interred in Rowe Cemetery, Cheshire Township, Allegan County, Michigan.
