= Roger Bowman =

American baseball player (1927–1997)

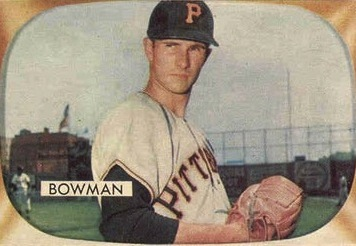
- Pitcher
- Born: August 18, 1927; Amsterdam, New York, U.S.
- Died: July 21, 1997 (aged 69); Los Angeles, California, U.S.
- Batted: Right Threw: Left

MLB debut
- September 22, 1949, for the New York Giants

Last MLB appearance
- May 22, 1955, for the Pittsburgh Pirates

MLB statistics
- Win–loss record: 2–11
- Earned run average: 5.81
- Strikeouts: 75
- Stats at Baseball Reference

Teams
- New York Giants (1949, 1951–1952); Pittsburgh Pirates (1953, 1955)

Roger Clinton Bowman (August 18, 1927 – July 21, 1997) was an American pitcher in Major League Baseball. He played for the New York Giants and Pittsburgh Pirates.

== Baseball career ==
Bowman was signed by the New York Giants before the 1946 season. He appeared in games for the Giants in 1949, 1951, and 1952, and he played for the Pittsburgh Pirates in 1953 and 1955. He had a career win–loss record of 2–11 in the major leagues. Most of Bowman's professional baseball career was spent in the minor leagues, where he played from 1946 to 1961, winning 131 games and losing 119 overall.

In 1950, while playing for the Jersey City Giants of the International League, Bowman went 16–11 with a 3.71 earned run average. In addition, he led the league with 233 innings pitched and 181 strikeouts.

Bowman hurled the first of two Pacific Coast League no-hitters while pitching with the Oakland Oaks in 1952 against the Hollywood Stars.

Bowman joined the Hollywood Stars in 1954, as he posted a 22–13 record with a 2.51 ERA and 165 strikeouts in 258 1/3 of work, leading the PCL in wins and games started (37). He then pitched a seven-inning perfect game against the Portland Beavers on the final day of the season to give his team a tie for the pennant race with the San Diego Padres, who then won a one-game playoff.

In between, Bowman played winter ball with the Alacranes del Almendares in the Cuban League and for the Licoreros de Pampero in the Venezuelan League, where he was awarded Jugador Estrella (Star Player) in the 1955–56 season. Besides, he pitched for Almendares in the 1955 Caribbean Series.

Bowman spent his final Minor League seasons pitching for the Minneapolis Millers, Buffalo Bisons, Sacramento Solons, Louisville Colonels and Portland Beavers, before joining the Hawaii Islanders as an assistant manager to Tommy Heath, who had been his manager with the Trenton Giants in 1947.

During his playing days, Bowman completed an arts degree at Colgate University and later completed an education degree at the University of California, Los Angeles. After baseball, Bowman operated an upholstery business in Santa Monica for 45 years. He died in Los Angeles in 1997 at the age of 69.
