= Freeman's Park =

Park in Emeryville, California

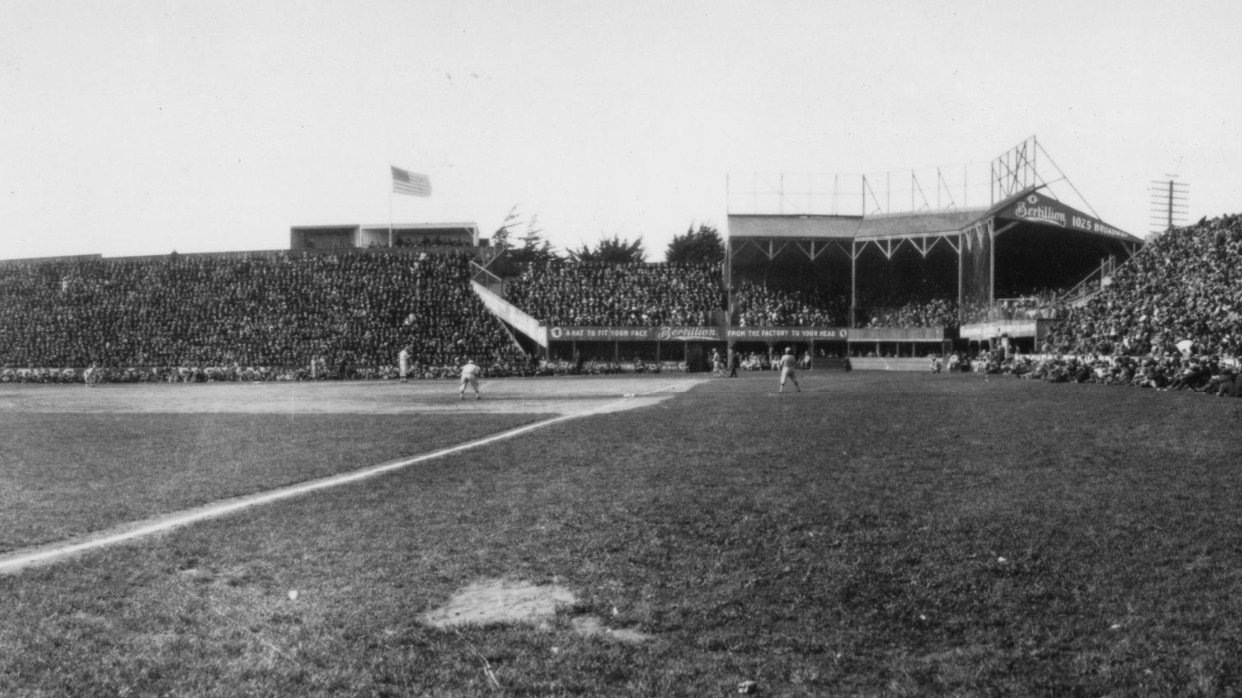
Freeman's Park

Freeman's Park was a baseball park in Emeryville, California. It was the home field of the Oakland Clamdiggers of the California State League during 1899–1902; and the Oakland Oaks of the Pacific Coast League in 1903 and then again during 1907–1912.

The venue was established by a developer named William Freeman Jr. by about 1897. His father, British-born William Freeman Sr., was likewise a developer.

The ballpark was located within the city limits of Emeryville, between Oakland and Berkeley, located approximately at 37.843°N 122.284°W. The site was a square plot of land bounded by 59th Street (south, left field); San Pablo Avenue (east, third base); buildings and 61st Street (north, first base); and Fremont Street (west, right field). It was several blocks north of the eventual site of Oaks Park.

When the Oakland ball club moved from Idora Park back to a (newly-refurbished) Freeman's Park in 1907, they brought their bleachers with them. The newspaper reporter expressed a hope that the bleachers would get more usage at Freeman's than they did at Idora.

The field was also used for amateur baseball, football, and soccer throughout its duration. Its final sporting events (soccer matches) were held in January and February 1915. The venue was eventually demolished and the block was developed into mostly housing with some small businesses.
