= Jimmy Whelan =

American baseball player (1890–1929)

- Pinch hitter
- Born: May 11, 1890; Kansas City, Kansas, U.S.
- Died: November 29, 1929 (aged 39); Dayton, Ohio, U.S.
- Batted: Right Threw: Right

MLB debut
- April 24, 1913, for the St. Louis Cardinals

Last MLB appearance
- April 24, 1913, for the St. Louis Cardinals

MLB statistics
- Games played: 1
- At bats: 1
- Hits: 0
- Stats at Baseball Reference

Teams
- St. Louis Cardinals (1913)

James Francis Whelan (May 11, 1890 – November 29, 1929) was an American professional baseball player who appeared in one major league game as a pinch hitter for the St. Louis Cardinals in 1913. He had a more extensive career in the minor leagues, where he was a utility player who played third base, second base, and the outfield. Whelan's professional career began in 1910, when he played for the Junction City Soldiers in his home state of Kansas.
