= Bill Prough =

American baseball player (1887–1937)

- Pitcher
- Born: November 28, 1887; Markle, Indiana, U.S.
- Died: December 29, 1936 (aged 49); Richmond, Indiana, U.S.
- Batted: Right Threw: Right

MLB debut
- April 27, 1912, for the Cincinnati Reds

Last MLB appearance
- April 27, 1912, for the Cincinnati Reds

MLB statistics
- Win–loss record: 0–0
- Earned run average: 6.00
- Strikeouts: 1
- Stats at Baseball Reference

Teams
- Cincinnati Reds (1912)

Herschel Clinton "Bill" Prough (November 28, 1887 – December 29, 1937) was an American professional baseball player. Prough was a right-handed pitcher, pitching in the Major Leagues for one season, 1912 with the Cincinnati Reds. He had an extended and successful minor league career, pitching for 17 seasons and compiling over 4,600 innings pitched.

Prough was born in Markle, Indiana, and died in Richmond, Indiana.
