= Washington Park (Los Angeles) =

Baseball park in Los Angeles, California, United States

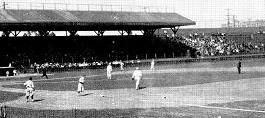
- Washington Park ca. 1917

- Location within the Los Angeles metropolitan area Location within California Location within the United States
- Interactive map of Washington Park
- Address: 218 W Washington Blvd; Los Angeles, California 90007
- Coordinates: 34.032288°N 118.266798°W
- Field size: Left field: 325 ft (99 m); Center field: 411 ft (125 m); Right field: 325 ft (99 m)

Construction
- Built: 1910–1911
- Opened: March 28, 1911
- Expanded: 1913
- Closed: September 27, 1925
- Demolished: 1925

Tenants
- Los Angeles Angels (PCL) 1911–1925; Venice Tigers (PCL) 1913–1914

Washington Park was a baseball park in Los Angeles, California, United States. It was primarily used for baseball and was the home of the Los Angeles Angels in the Pacific Coast League (PCL) from its opening on March 28, 1911, until they moved to Wrigley Field late in the 1925 season. The final game at Washington Park was held on September 27, 1925.

Through the 1910 season, the Angels had played at the ballfield contained within Chutes Park, a city amusement park bounded by Washington (north), Main (east), 21st (south) and Grand (west).

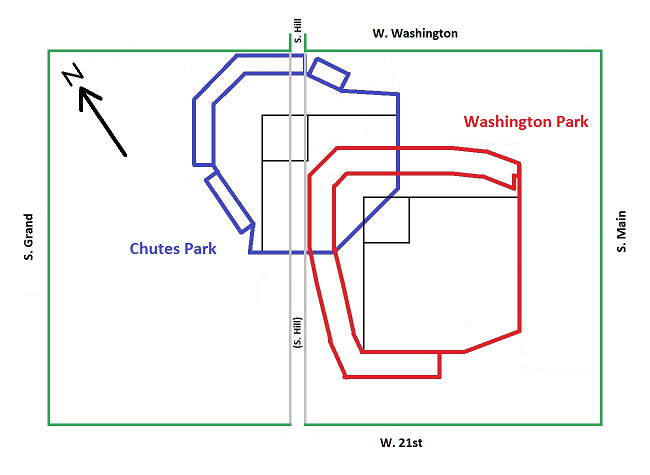
Approximate footprints of the two ballparks

In the 1910–1911 off-season, the old ballpark and some of the rides were demolished, and a new ballpark was built within the same large block. Sanborn maps show that the new infield and covered stands were positioned south and east of their predecessor, overlaying the centerfield area of the old park and much of the former waterslide area. Hill Street was eventually cut through the western portion of the large block. The new ballpark bordered Hill Street on its first base side, and was set back from Washington (third base), Main (left field) and 21st (right field). Some local newspapers dubbed it "Washington-Street Park", but "Washington Park" was the prevailing reference.

The remaining amusement park structures were sold in late December 1912 and soon demolished. After having played in somewhat cramped quarters for two seasons, Washington Park's seating areas and the outfield itself were expanded for the 1913 season. The now-vacant areas along Main and Washington were eventually allocated for parking. Contemporary city directories give the ballpark's address as 218 West Washington.

A number of aerial photos of Washington Park exist. Some of them show an H-shaped building on the northwest corner of Main and Washington. That building provides a good landmark to orient the photos with the current street maps.

In 1913 and 1914, the Venice Tigers of the PCL also played home games at Washington Park, except for Sunday morning and special holiday games.

A football game between USC and California on November 25, 1915, drew 8,000 spectators, the largest crowd to have seen a football game in Southern California at that time. Buster Keaton filmed a scene of Neighbors (1920) at Washington Park.

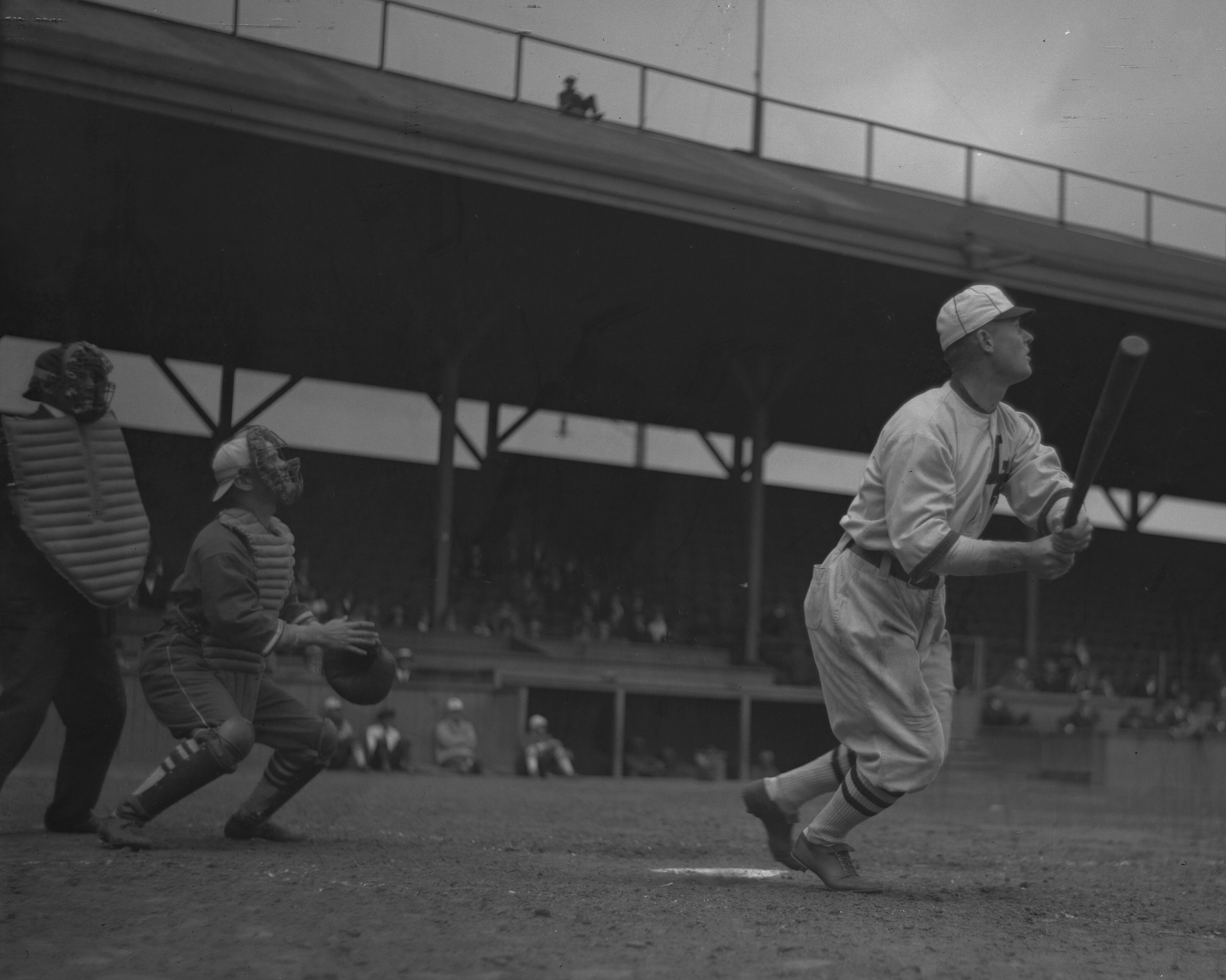
Sam Crawford batting at Washington Park ca.1920

The sources say that William Wrigley Jr., owner of the Angels, was rebuffed in his request to build an underground parking garage beneath the ballpark, whose land the Angels were renting. He then decided to purchase land to build a new ballpark. It was named Wrigley Field and opened late in the 1925 season, at 42nd Street and Avalon Boulevard. It was about 1½ miles straight south of Washington Park.

The final field dimensions were discussed in an article comparing Washington Park with Wrigley Field. Left field was 325 ft (99 m), center field was 411 ft (125 m), and right field was 325 ft (99 m).

The final baseball games at Washington Park were a series by the Angels vs. Seattle, which concluded on September 20; and a series by the Vernon Tigers vs. Portland, which concluded on September 27. The Los Angeles vs. Seattle series ended in a doubleheader which was marred by a forfeiture by Seattle in the second game. The Vernon vs. Portland series also ended in a doubleheader, both games won by Vernon.

Neighbors - Washington Park cameo at about the 7:15 mark. (public domain, full short)

Washington Park was demolished soon after the final game in 1925. Much of the lot remained vacant for some years. The parking area on the southeast corner of Washington and Hill was used as the site of Billy Graham's Los Angeles Crusade in the fall of 1949. The Mode O'Day Building, constructed in 1927 at the northeast corner of Washington and Hill, which still stands, can be seen in the background of some of the 1949 crusade photos.

As of February 2022, the site is occupied by commercial buildings, parking lots, and a McDonald's. Los Angeles Trade–Technical College (LATTC) is a block to the west, as is the Grand/LATTC station of the Los Angeles Metro Rail system. The International Mart (formerly the Mode O'Day building), a 14-story edifice that houses a grocery store and warehouse, is a block to the east. The nearest freeway is the 110, a few blocks west of the Metro stop.

== Sources ==
- Reidenbaugh, Lowell; Carter, Craig (1983). The Sporting News: Take Me Out to the Ball Park (1st ed.). St. Louis, Mo: Sporting News Pub. Co. pp. 138–142. ISBN 978-0-8920-4101-5.
- Benson, Michael (1989). Ballparks of North America: A Comprehensive Historical Reference to Baseball Grounds, Yards, and Stadiums, 1845 to Present. Jefferson, N.C: McFarland. p. 209. ISBN 978-0-8995-0367-7.
