= Oaks Park (stadium) =

Baseball stadium in Emeryville, California

Coordinates: 37°49′59″N 122°16′54″W

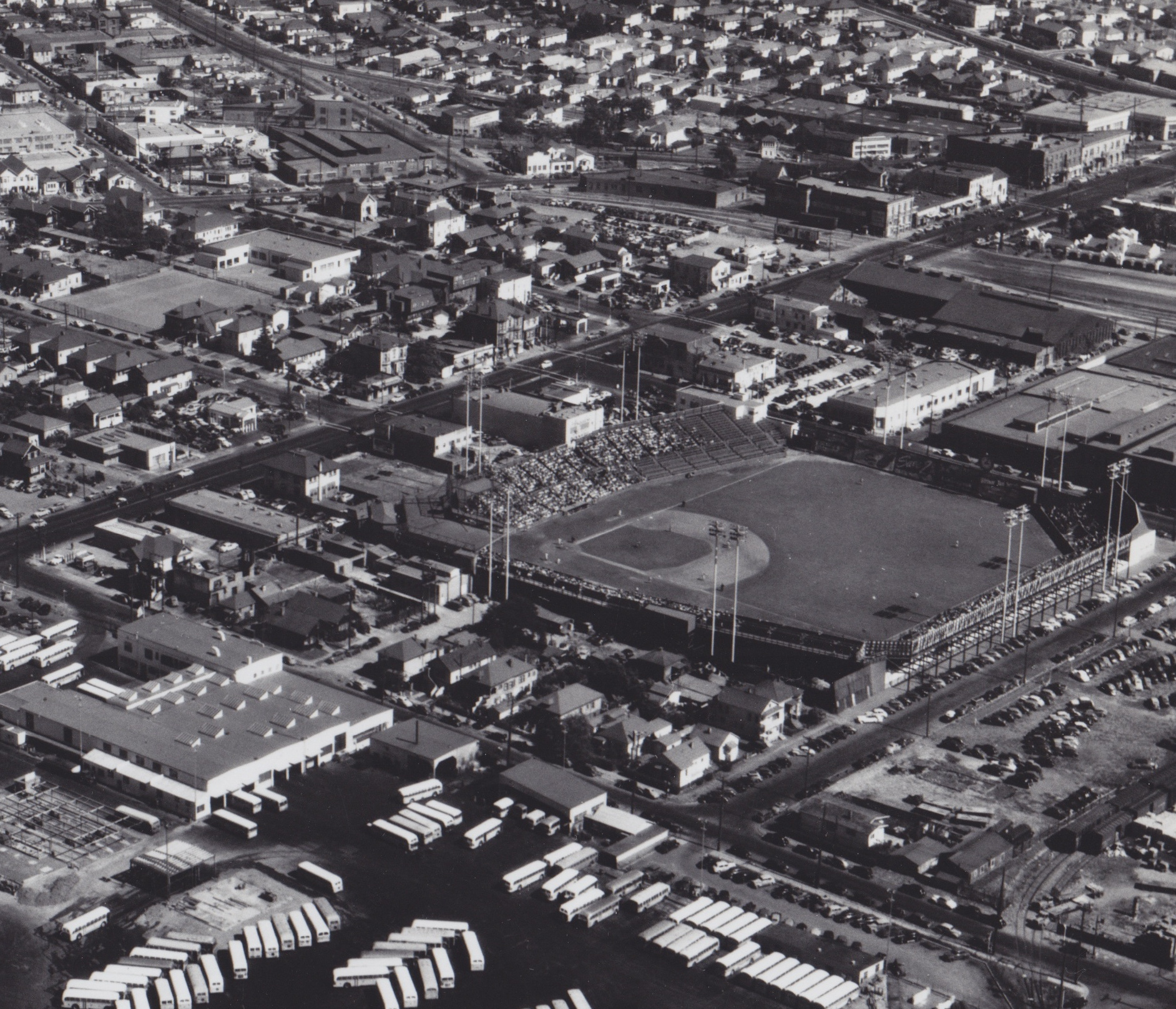
Aerial photograph of Oaks Park

Oaks Park, formally known as the Oakland Baseball Park, and at times nicknamed Emeryville Park, was a baseball stadium in Emeryville, California. It was primarily used for baseball, and was the home field of the Oakland Oaks baseball team in the Pacific Coast League (PCL). It opened in 1913, and held 11,000 people (4,000 in the grandstand and 7,000 in the two bleachers). The Oaks played there until 1955.

The ballpark was located within the city limits of Emeryville, between Oakland and Berkeley. The site was on the block bounded by 45th Street (north, first base); San Pablo Avenue (east, third base); Park Avenue (south, left field); and Watts Street (west, right field). The stadium did not front directly on San Pablo where a strip of various small commercial buildings stood, now replaced by a single one-story commercial building with several chain businesses. The site was otherwise about five blocks southeast of Freeman's Park on San Pablo. It was also a block away from a race track used by the California Jockey Club.

Oaks Park was highly accessible, as a major streetcar line ran on San Pablo Avenue, and a station serving several of the Key System's transbay commuter rail lines existed a few blocks south at Yerba Buena Avenue.

The Oaks had been playing most of their home games (except Thursdays and Sunday mornings) at Recreation Park in San Francisco, starting when that new ballpark opened in 1907. Even after moving back to Oakland, the Oaks would play a number of games each year in San Francisco. PCL founding father J. Cal Ewing owned both the Oaks and the San Francisco Seals from 1903 until sometime in the 1920s, at which point the Oaks began playing all their games in Oakland. The short-lived San Francisco club known as the Mission Wolves also played some of their 1914 home games at Oaks Park.

During the planning stage, the left field foul line was stated as 330 ft (100 m) and the right field line as 322 ft (98 m). The block was stated to be 450 ft (140 m) square.[Oakland Tribune, December 8 1912, p.41]

In an article about the plans for the new Seals Stadium, for comparison the dimensions of Oaks Park were stated to be left field foul line 335 ft (102 m), center field 400 ft (120 m) and right field line 323 ft (98 m).[San Francisco Examiner, February 1, 1931, p.29]

The park was not well maintained in its later years, contributing to a steep decline in attendance. These factors forced the Oaks to move to Vancouver in 1956. That move proved prescient, as the New York Giants moved to San Francisco two years later, and would have likely displaced the Oaks in any event.

Until recently, the site of the park was partly an empty, fenced-off lot, with Pixar Studios overlapping it where Watts Street used to run through. In 2011, it was incorporated into the second phase of Pixar Studios' expansion. It is now a parking lot with a public bicycle path and park on the San Pablo side of the property, across the street from Oaks Card Club.

== Gallery ==
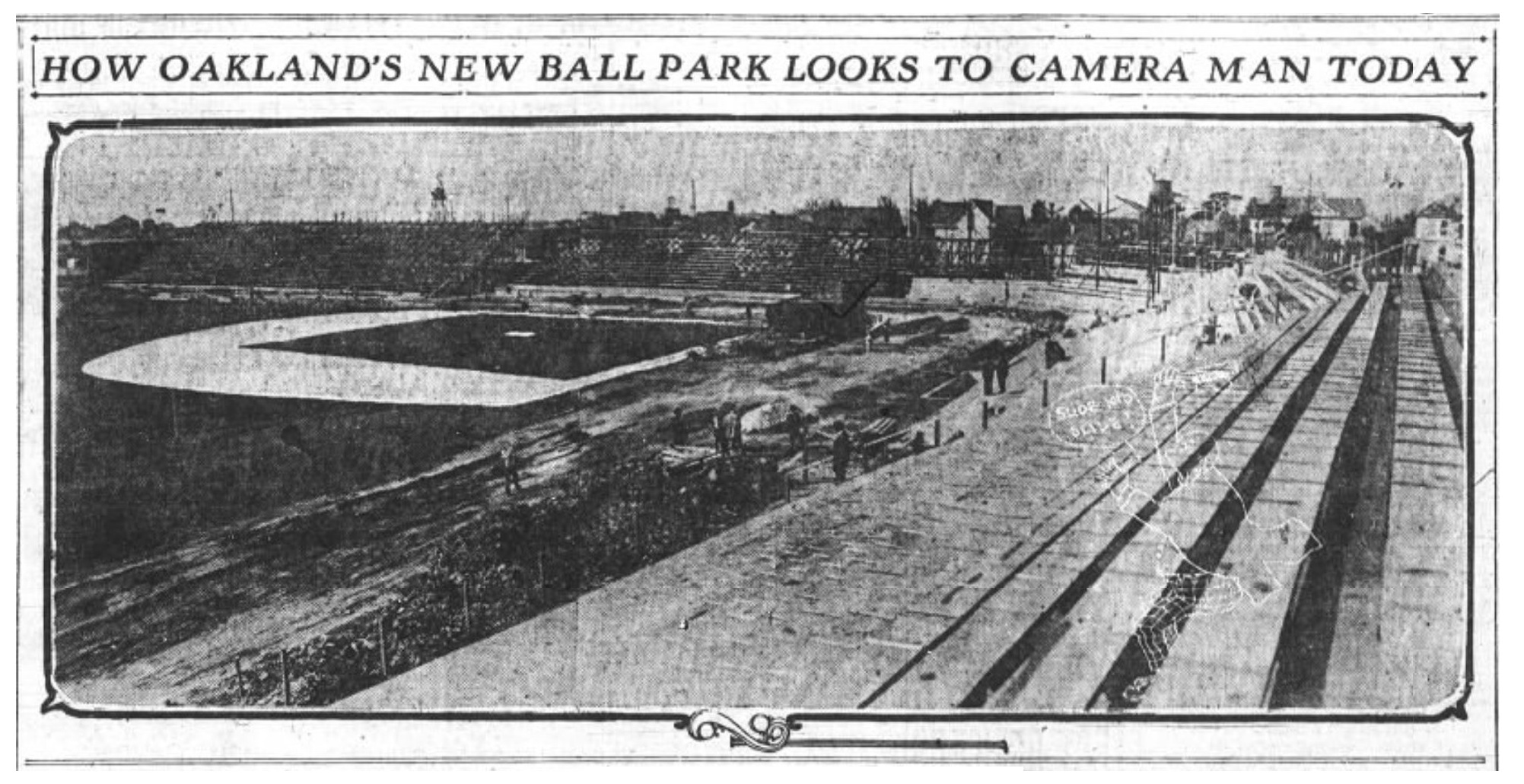
Oaks Park under construction

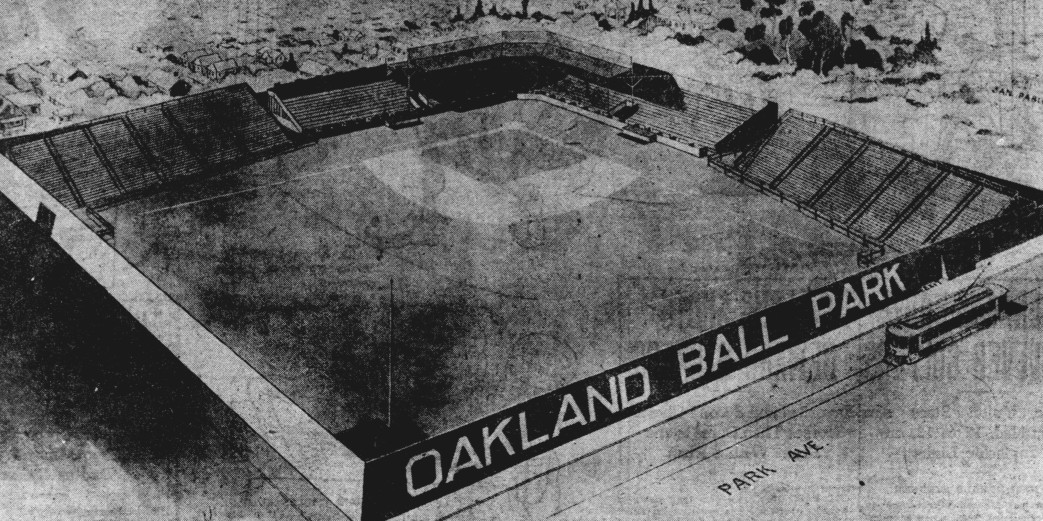
Oakland Baseball Park artist's conception from The San Francisco Call on February 16, 1913

Plaque commemorating Oakland Ball Park

== Sources ==
- Take Me Out to the Ball Park, Lowell Reidenbaugh, The Sporting News, 1983 & 1987, p.200
