= Idora Park =

Defunct amusement park in Oakland, California, US

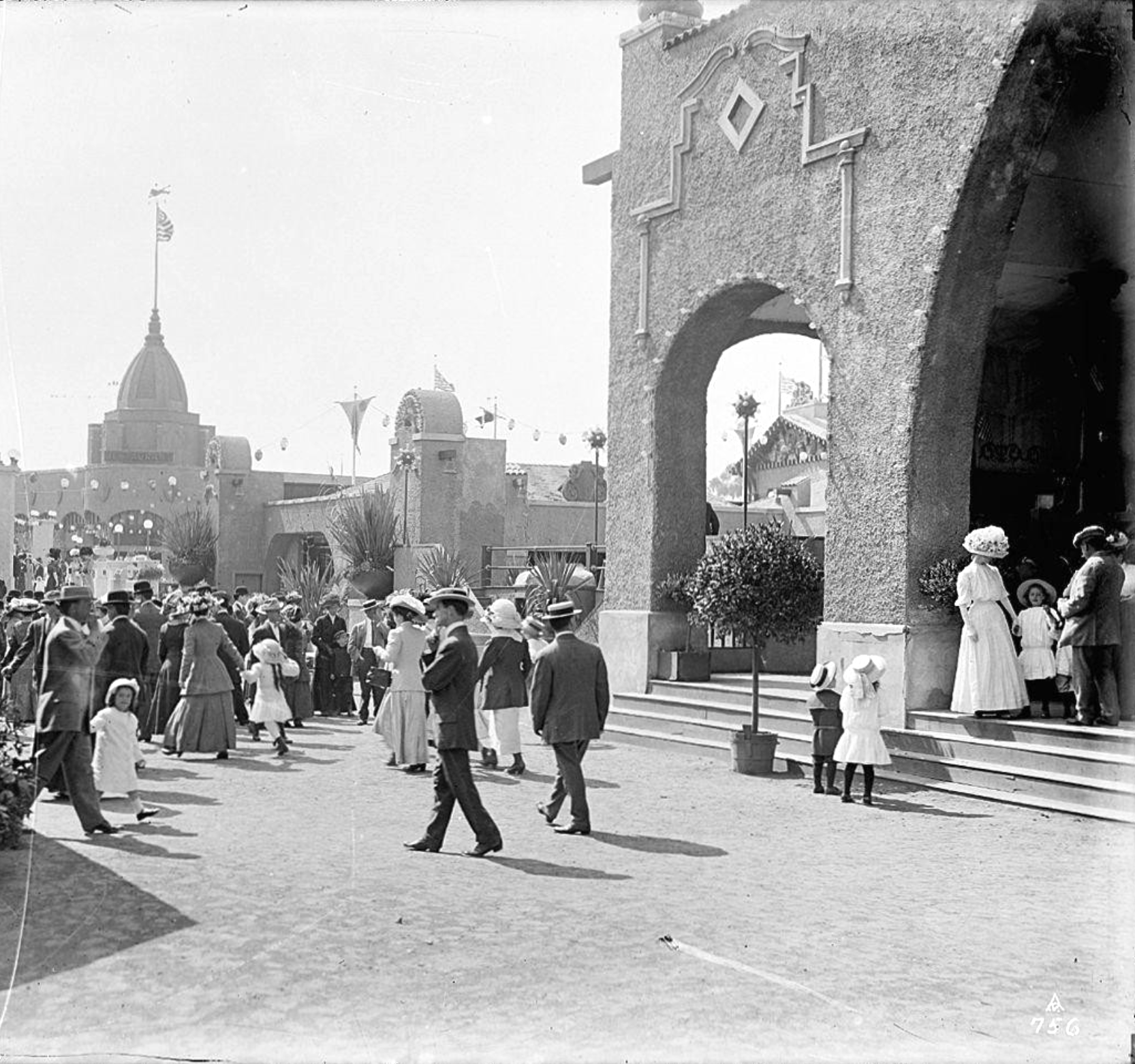
- Idora Park crowds, c. 1912
- Interactive map of Idora Park
- Location: Oakland, California, U.S.
- Coordinates: 37°50′32.62″N 122°15′47.36″W
- Status: Defunct
- Opened: 1904
- Closed: January 1929 (25 years)
- Theme: Trolley park
- Area: 17.5-acre (71,000 m2)

Idora Park was a 17.5-acre (71,000 m^{2}) Victorian era trolley park in north Oakland, California constructed in 1904 on the site of an informal park setting called Ayala Park on the north banks of Temescal Creek. It was leased by the Ingersoll Pleasure and Amusement Park Company that ran several Eastern pleasure parks. What began as a pleasure ground in a rural setting for Sunday picnics evolved into a complete amusement park visited by many residents of the San Francisco Bay Area. Its popularity declined after the advent of the automobile, and it was closed and demolished in 1929.

== History ==
=== Opening ===
The Realty Syndicate constructed the park in 1903 on the north banks of Temescal Creek in North Oakland (on a site of present-day Ayala Park). The main gate of the park was located on Telegraph Avenue above 56th Street; and the park was located on the block bounded by Telegraph Avenue, Shattuck Avenue, 56th and 58th streets. When the park opened in 1903, Rodney Ingersoll had erected the first figure-eight "sky railway" on the site. A wall surrounded the park. Admission was 10 cents, and it was open 30 or more weeks per year.

=== Operations ===
Idora Park was leased by the Ingersoll Pleasure and Amusement Park Company that ran several Eastern pleasure parks. Originally its name was to be Kennywood Park (after an amusement park in Pennsylvania). Mr. Ingersoll may have decided to name it after his daughter, Idora. The Realty Syndicate also owned and operated the Key System transit company, the Claremont Hotel and the Key Route Inn. The company's major partners were Frank C. Havens; and Francis M. "Borax" Smith, who earned his fortune in borax mining, subsequently investing it in transit and commercial and housing properties in the East Bay area. Bertrand York managed the park from 1911 until its razing in 1929.

=== Idora Park Opera Company ===
Idora Park was famous for its opera house. In the aftermath of the 1906 San Francisco earthquake, as many as 2,500 displaced people found shelter in Idora Park. Food and relief supplies were provided by the Realty Syndicate, purchased from Capwell's Department Store. In the period that followed the 1906 earthquake, comic stars from the Tivoli Theater of San Francisco relocated to Oakland and renamed themselves the Idora Park Opera Company. Shows like The Mikado, The Pirates of Penzance and The Wizard of the Nile were performed under the theater direction of Ferris Hartman, with music direction by Paul Stiendorff in a wooden opera house called the Wigwam Theater.

In 1908, the company changed names to the Dollar Grand Opera Company and later to the San Carlos Opera Company, which toured nationally.

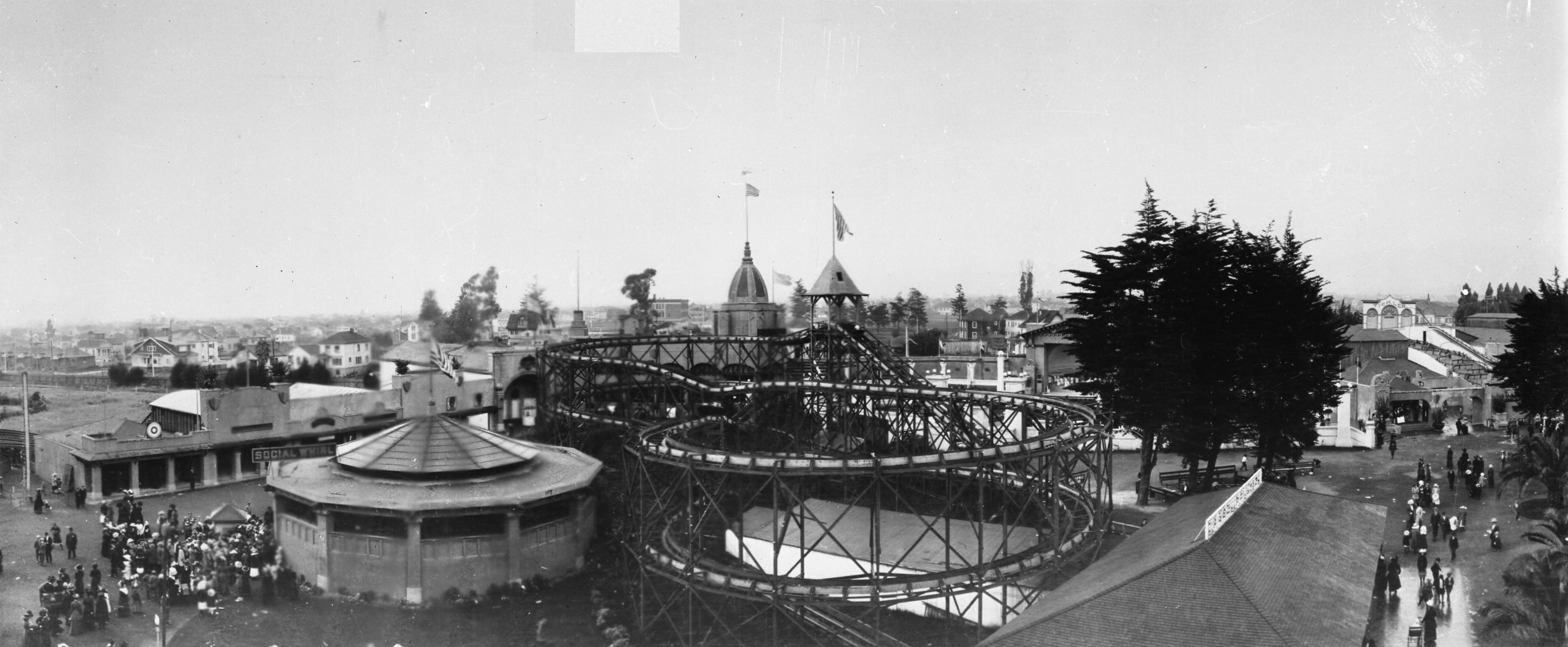
Idora Park, Oakland, 1910

== Rides ==
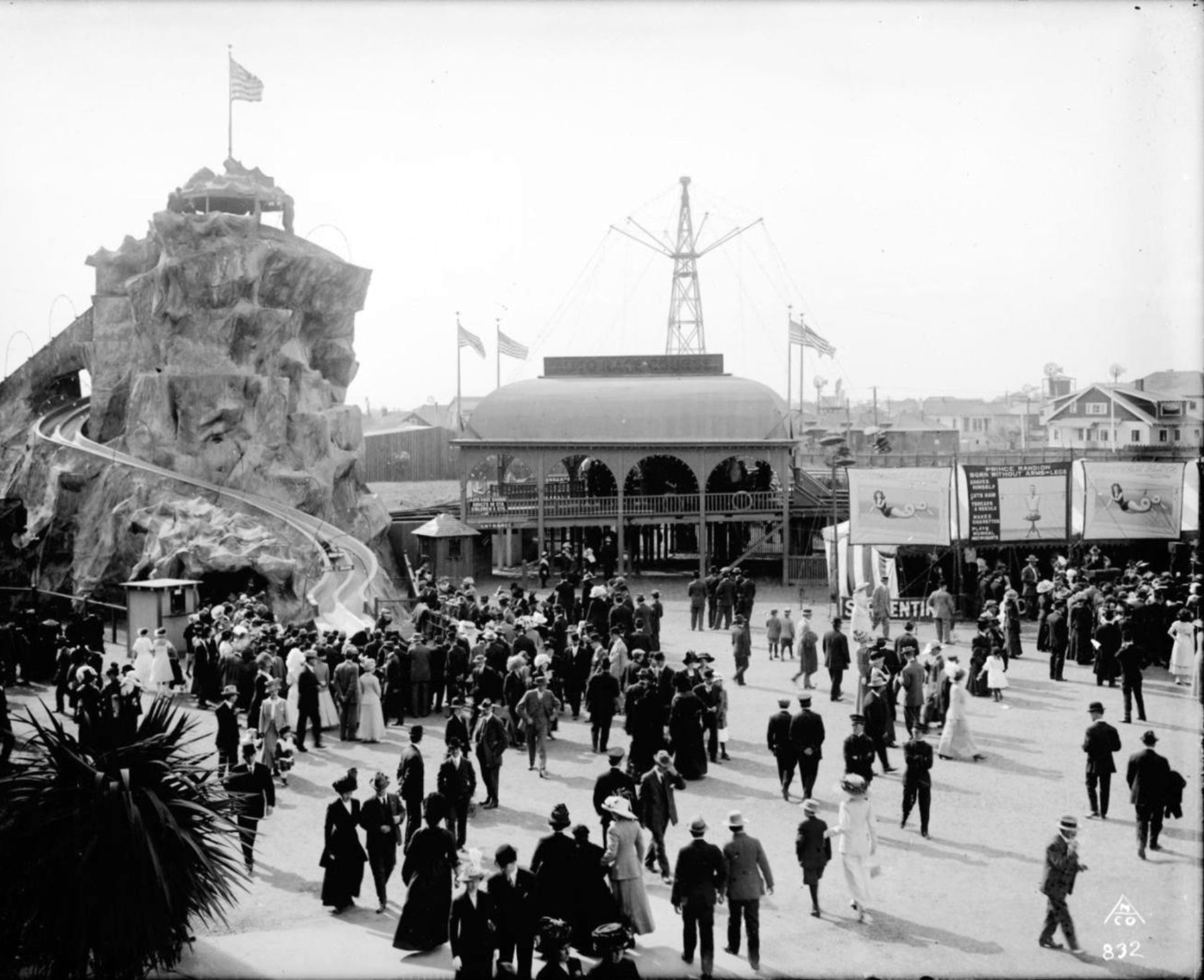
The Midway rides (1912), shows the "Mountain Slide" ride, the "Flying Swing" ride, and the "Auto Race Course" ride

Idora Park rides cost 5 cents. Many were advertised as being the "largest" or "first." Rides were renamed regularly. In published descriptions of the park, one finds titles such as Dodge 'em, The Whip, Over the Top, Race Through the Clouds, and the Magic Carpet.

- The Circle Swing, A large round flat disk or bench suspended by chains from a central pole, on which people could sit to swing
- The Social Whirl, a platform inside a structure where people sat until centrifugal force pushed them off
- The Flying Swing, a swings (ride) with cars suspended from a central point that turned fast enough for the cars to become elevated
- Haunted swing
- Barrel-of-Fun
- Trip through Hades
- Helter Skelter, a slide-type ride
- Chutes
- Miniature railway train, a small steam-powered railroad that carried people through the park
- Fadgl auto trains
- Ferris wheel
- Touring cars
- 20-Car Skooter
- Circle Wave
- The Tickler, apparently a ride with a car on a twisting track
- Merry-go-round
- The Mountain Slide, which appeared to be a slide down through a mountain
- The Auto Race Course, a circular track where two full-size electrically powered automobiles, filled with people, raced each other to the finish
- Uncle Henry's Missouri Mule
- Noah's ark

=== Roller coasters ===
The park has five traditional roller coasters during its history:

- Ingersoll Figure 8 Toboggan, operated from 1906–1916
- L.A. Thompson Scenic Railway, operated from 1906–1921, (owned and operated by the Thompson Company)
- Race Thru The Clouds, a twin track coaster (dates unknown)
- The Big (or Giant) Dipper, operated from 1922 to 1928, John A. Miller designed at a cost of $60,000
- Skyrocket (or Thunderbolt), operated from 1927 to 1928, also designed by Miller

== Attractions ==
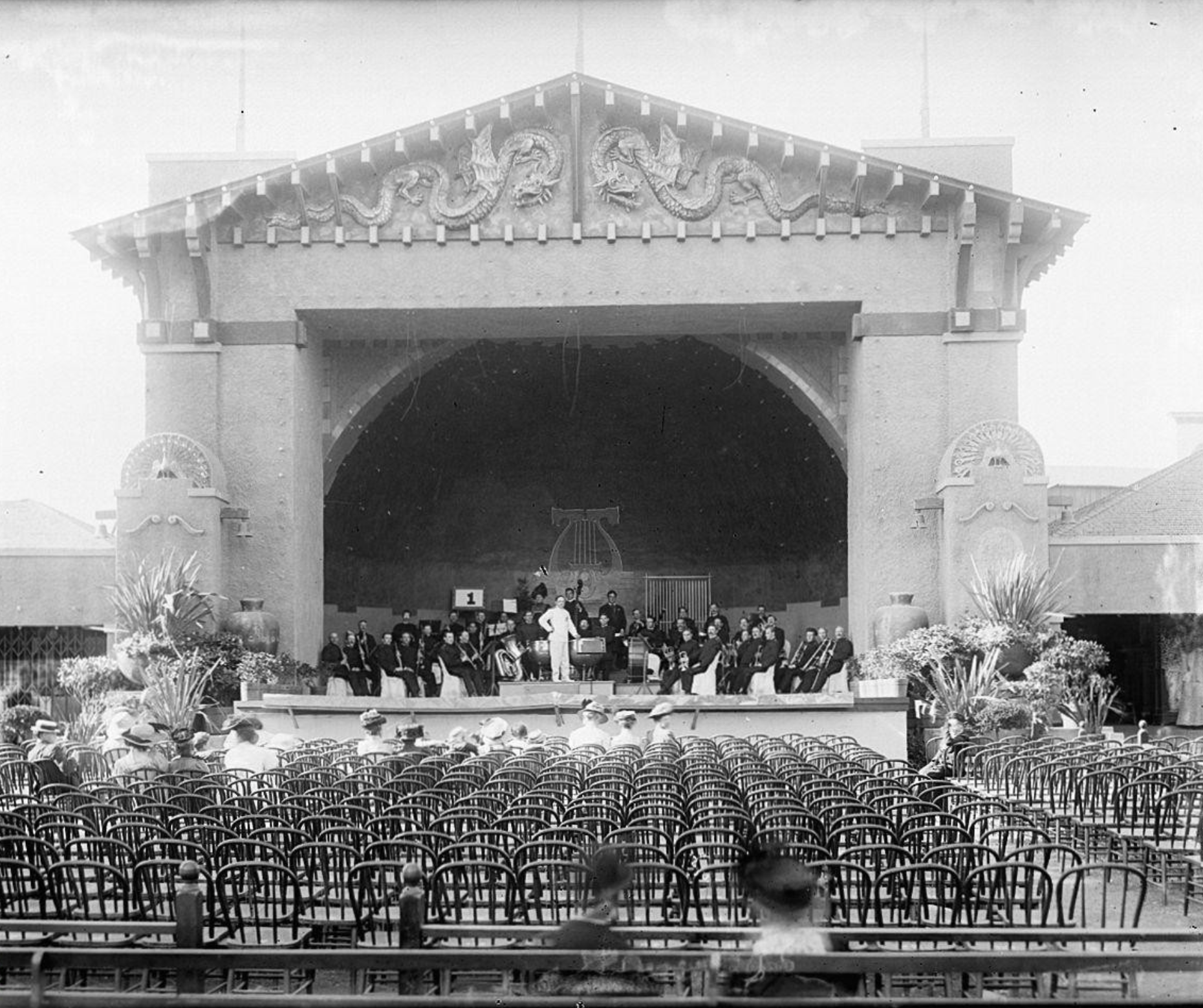
Band stand, 1915

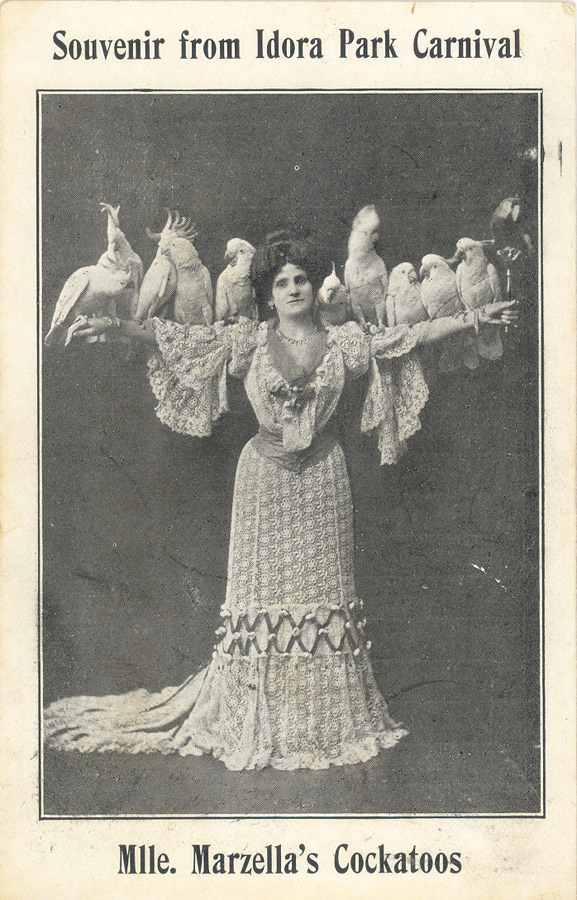
Idora Park Oakland Cockatoos, c. 1920

In the early 1900s, Idora Park was also the site of public demonstrations with lighter-than-air and heavier-than-air flying machines, including a balloon-launched glider flight by David Wilkie in a glider designed by John J. Montgomery on February 22, 1906. It was also the location for the final construction of The California Arrow, a dirigible built by Thomas Baldwin in 1904. On August 3, 1904, the first successful round-trip difficult flight in the United States was made by Baldwin with The California Arrow at Idora Park.

Idora Park boasted the first outdoor public address system and the largest horn loudspeaker built by Magnavox; the first radio theater in the West; and a huge searchlight. Like many things at the park, the searchlight was reputed to be the largest in the world; as well as their largest Victrola tower; and the largest roller skating rink west of Chicago. It was published by the Oakland Tribune, that Charlie Chaplin and Buster Keaton improved their skating skills at the Idora Park roller rink. The evening light display used so much power that it outstripped the original capacity, and a new system had to be installed in 1907.

In 1904 a ballpark with a 3000-seat double deck grandstand was erected, and after the 1906 earthquake, the Pacific Coast League relocated there. The park had the largest roller skating rink in California, the largest west of Chicago, that rented clamp-on skates. A bandstand was at its center. The Mountain Slide had a firework volcanic display on Saturday nights. There were hot-air balloon ascensions, from which the acrobatic team of Frank and Carrie Hamilton parachuted.

== Entertainment ==
Vaudeville performers sorted in Idora Park's stages. Famous stars who emerged from Oakland included Hobart Bosworth, Fatty Arbuckle, Mabel Normand, and possibly Lon Chaney. Walter DeLeon made his playwright debut at Idora Park. Aimee Semple McPherson held the largest outdoor baptism to date before 10,000 spectators in the swimming tanks after returning from the Far East following the death of her husband Robert James Semple. Something called the Cabaret de la Mort existed for a time. Jack London's daughter Becky described trips to Idora Park with her father.

== Refreshments ==
Idora Park was famous for its cream waffles (a recipe later published in the Oakland Tribune in 1972). Ice cream, popcorn and Coney Island "Red Hots" were a nickel, whiskey cost a dime, Busch Beer from St. Louis cost a nickel. The park's restaurant featured full-course meals for 75 cents to one dollar, and soda pop was available in 12-ounce bottles.

== Demise ==
Idora Park was eclipsed by the rise of the automobile and Neptune Beach in nearby Alameda. It closed in January 1929, and was razed later that year. A plan to develop the Central Square, an apartment and business complex by architect Hamilton Murdock, was announced. The Depression interrupted these plans, and a variety of small storybook houses and worker housing apartment blocks were eventually constructed on the 17-acre site.

By the 1930s, the Idora Park neighborhood subdivision was primary an Italian immigrant enclave, which thrived for many years. In 1930, a new roller rink, Rollerland, was constructed facing Telegraph Avenue in the 5400 block.
