= List of Pacific Coast League stadiums =

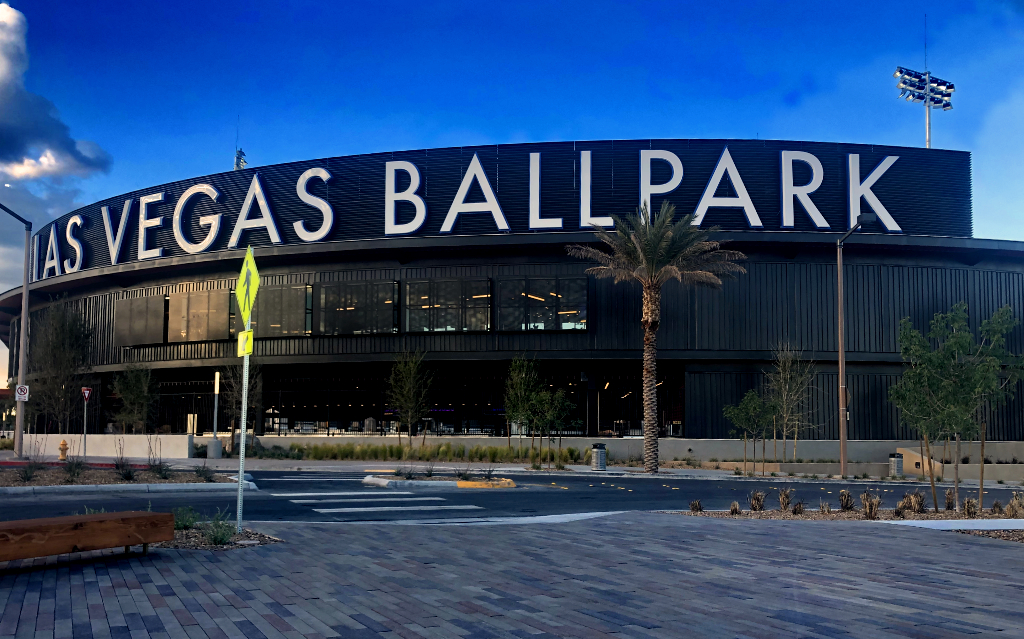
Las Vegas Ballpark, one of the newest stadiums in the Pacific Coast League, opened in 2019. It is the home of the Las Vegas Aviators.

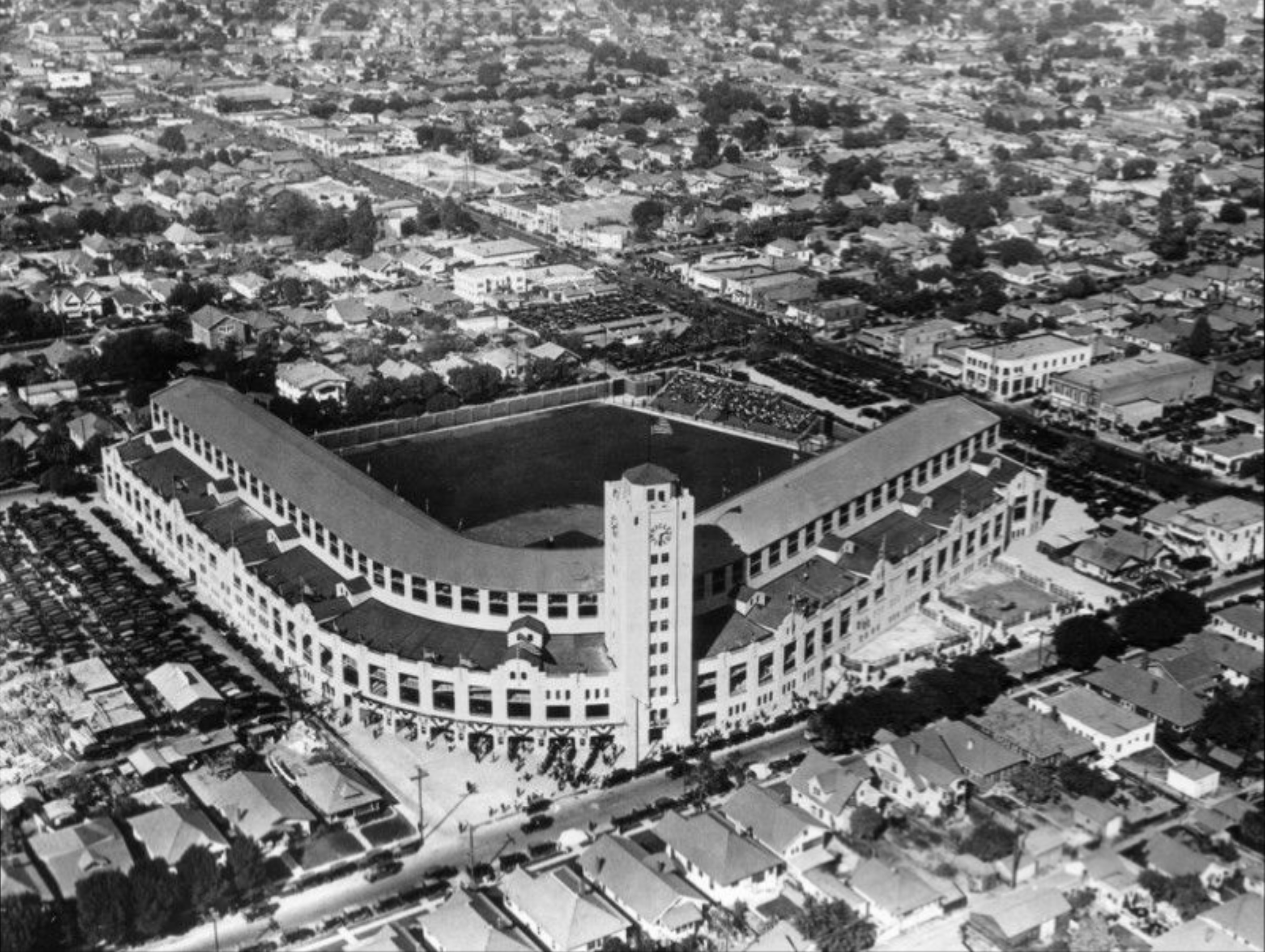
Wrigley Field in Los Angeles was home to the PCL's Los Angeles Angels, a former Triple-A affiliate of the Chicago Cubs, who play at its more famous namesake.

There are ten stadiums in use by Pacific Coast League (PCL) baseball teams. The oldest stadium is Cheney Stadium, home of the Tacoma Rainiers, which opened in 1960. The newest stadium is The Ballpark at America First Square, home of the Salt Lake Bees, which opened in 2025. One stadium was built in each of the 1960s and 1990s, four in the 2000s, three in the 2010s, and one in the 2020s. The highest seating capacity of all active stadiums is 14,014, at Sutter Health Park, where the Sacramento River Cats play. The lowest capacity is Tacoma's Cheney Stadium, with 6,500 seats. All stadiums use a grass surface.

From the PCL's foundation in 1903, its teams played at some 74 stadiums located among 45 municipalities across the United States and in Canada.

== Active stadiums ==
Name	Team	City	State	Opened	Capacity	Ref.
Cheney Stadium	Tacoma Rainiers	Tacoma	Washington	1960	6,500	
Chickasaw Bricktown Ballpark	Oklahoma City Comets	Oklahoma City	Oklahoma	1998	9,000	
Constellation Field	Sugar Land Space Cowboys	Sugar Land	Texas	2012	7,500	
The Ballpark at America First Square	Salt Lake Bees	South Jordan	Utah	2025	8,500	
Dell Diamond	Round Rock Express	Round Rock	Texas	2000	11,631	
Greater Nevada Field	Reno Aces	Reno	Nevada	2009	9,013	
Las Vegas Ballpark	Las Vegas Aviators	Las Vegas	Nevada	2019	10,000	
Rio Grande Credit Union Field at Isotopes Park	Albuquerque Isotopes	Albuquerque	New Mexico	2003	13,500	
Southwest University Park	El Paso Chihuahuas	El Paso	Texas	2014	9,500	
Sutter Health Park	Sacramento River Cats	Sacramento	California	2000	14,014	

=== Map ===
Current stadium locations:
- East Division
- West Division

=== Gallery ===
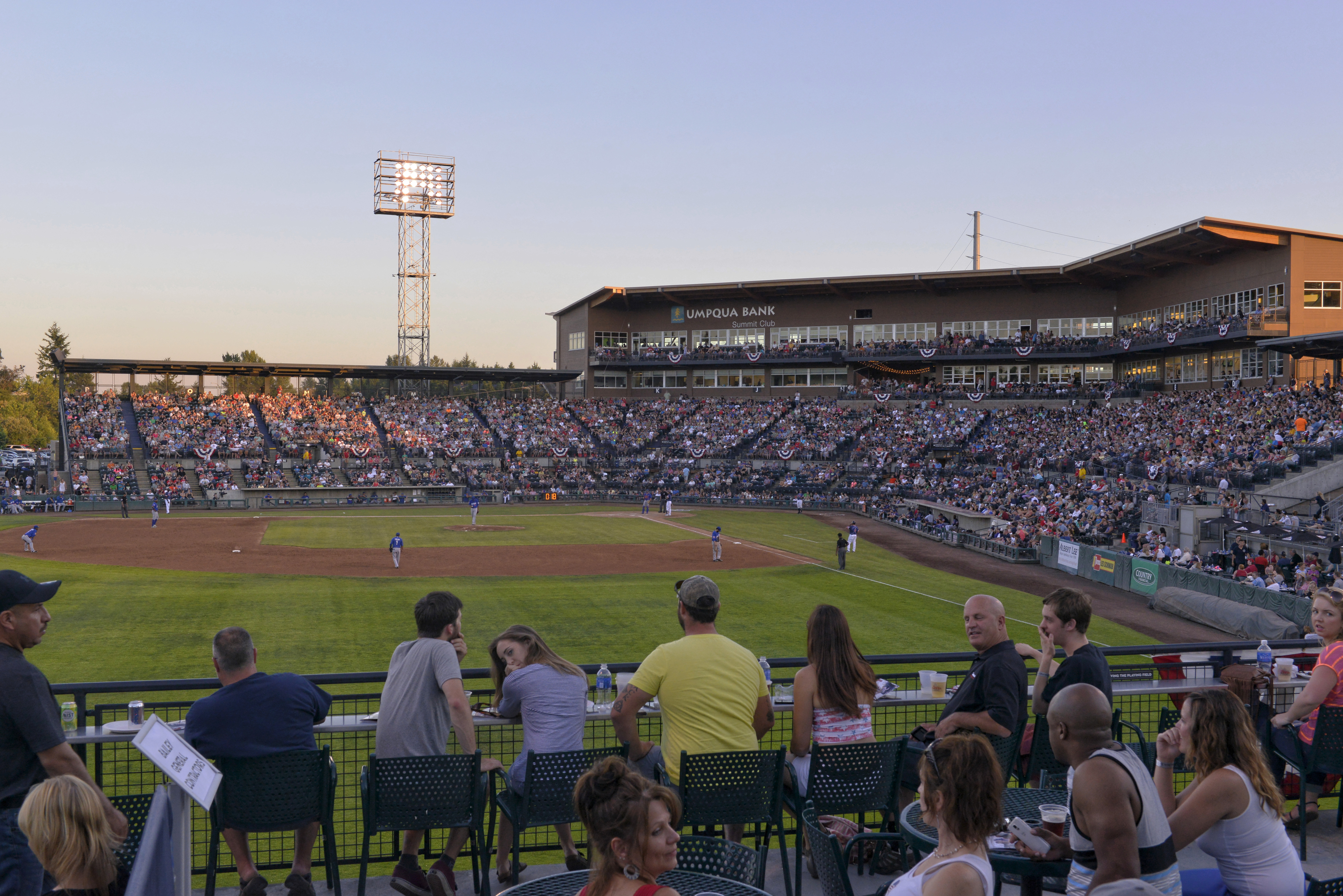
Cheney Stadium (Tacoma Rainiers)

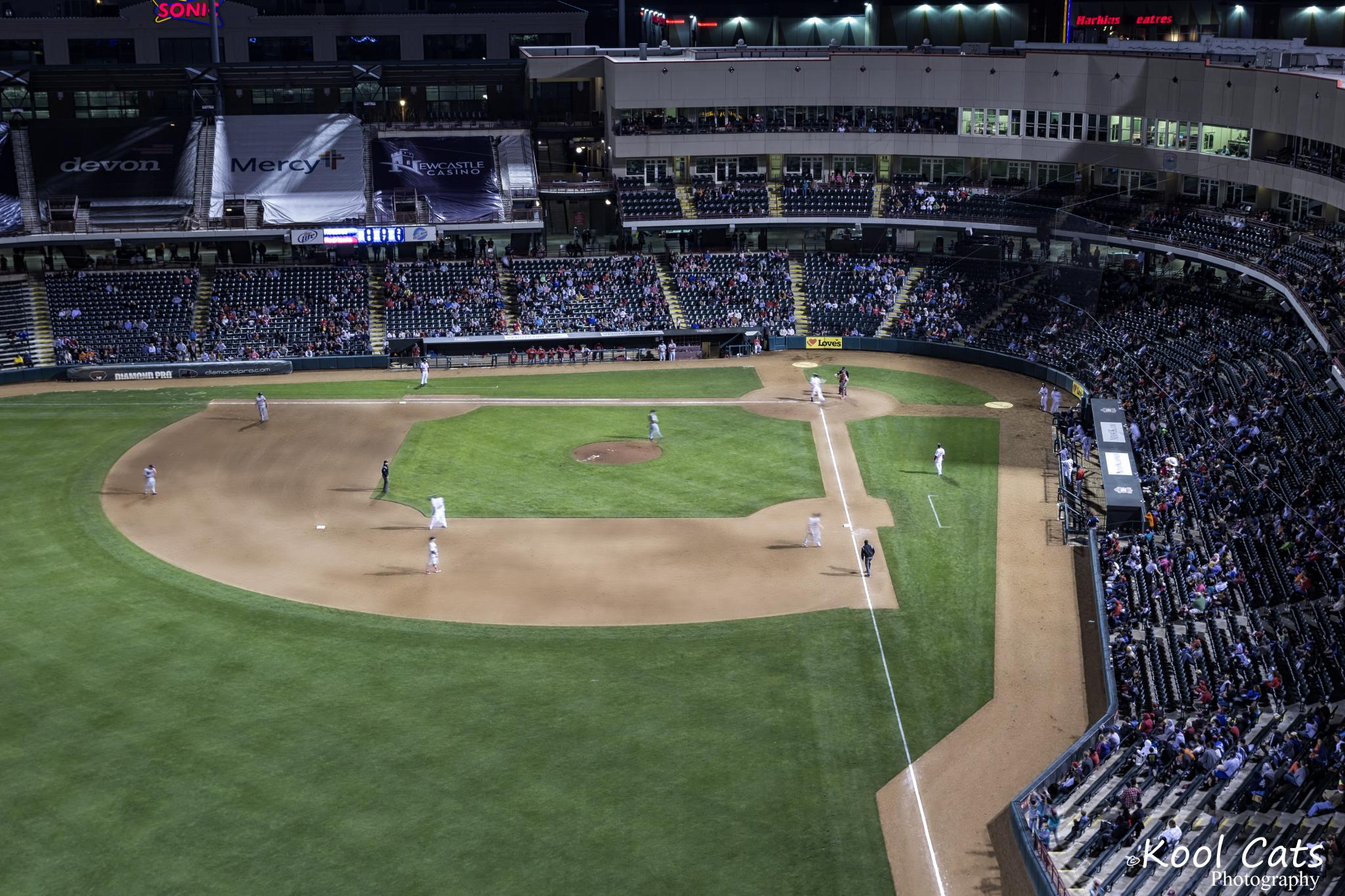
Chickasaw Bricktown Ballpark (Oklahoma City Comets)

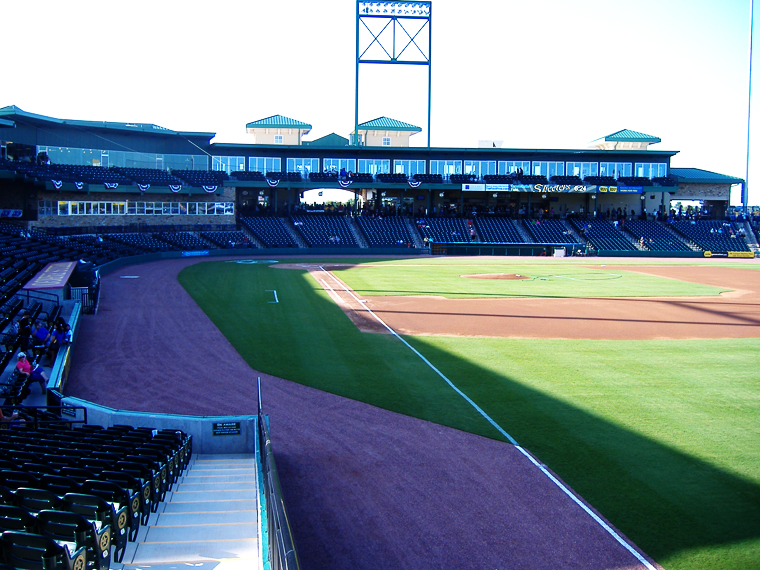
Constellation Field (Sugar Land Space Cowboys)

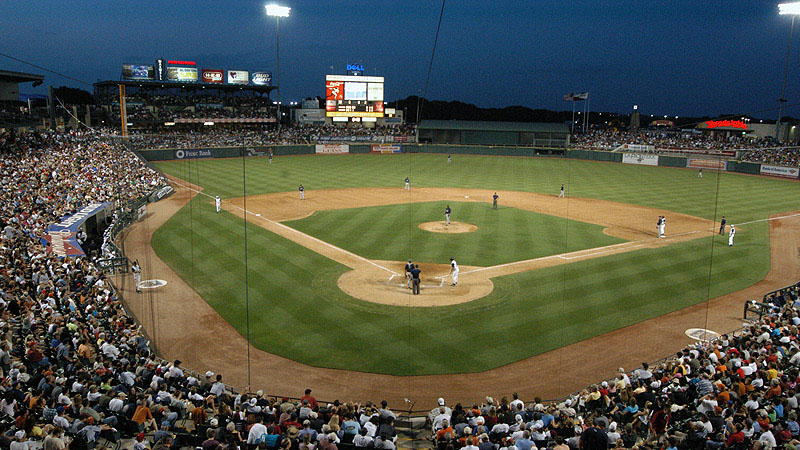
Dell Diamond (Round Rock Express)

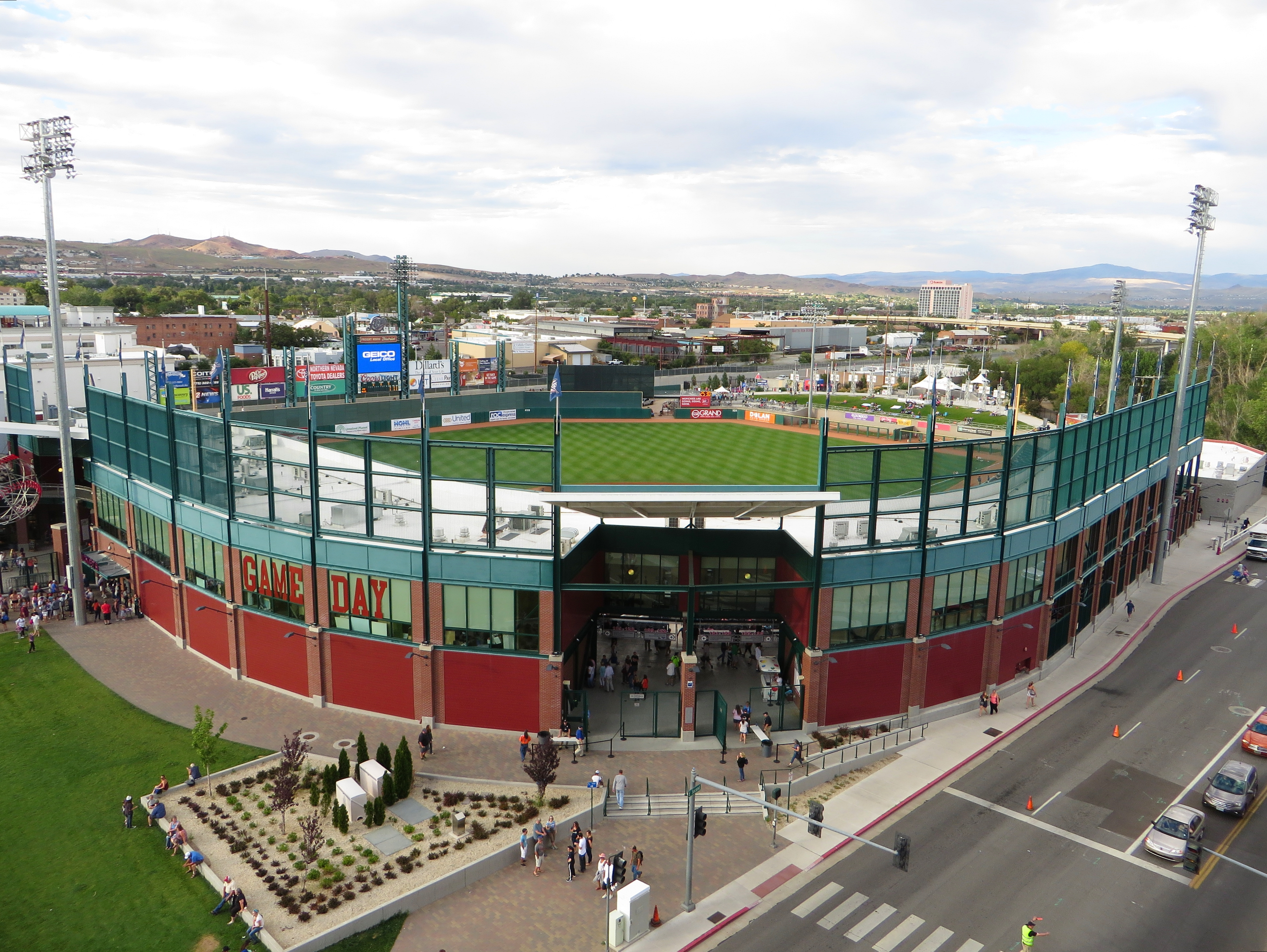
Greater Nevada Field (Reno Aces)

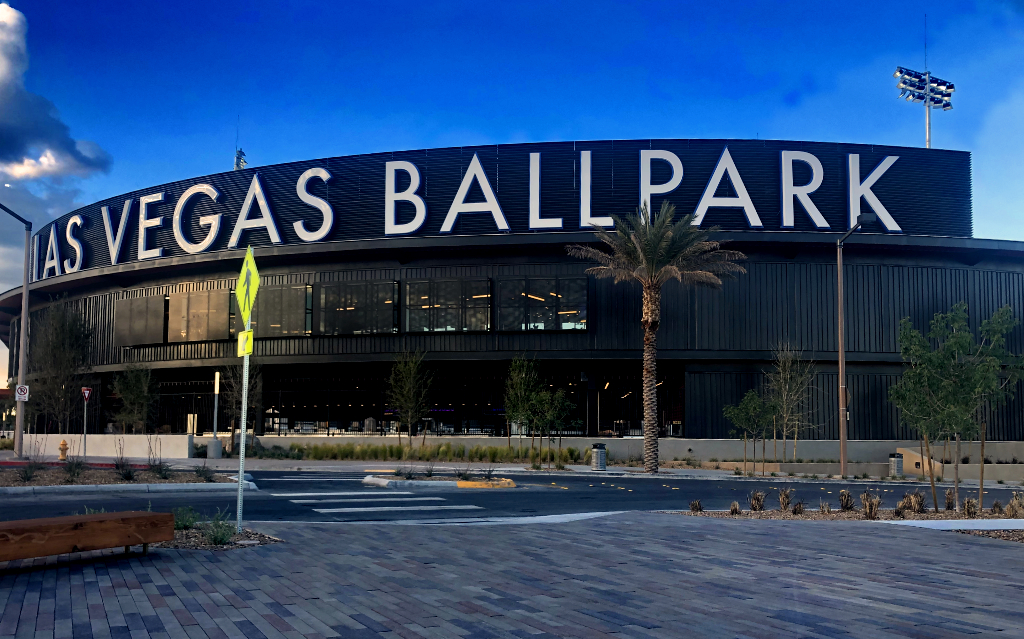
Las Vegas Ballpark (Las Vegas Aviators)

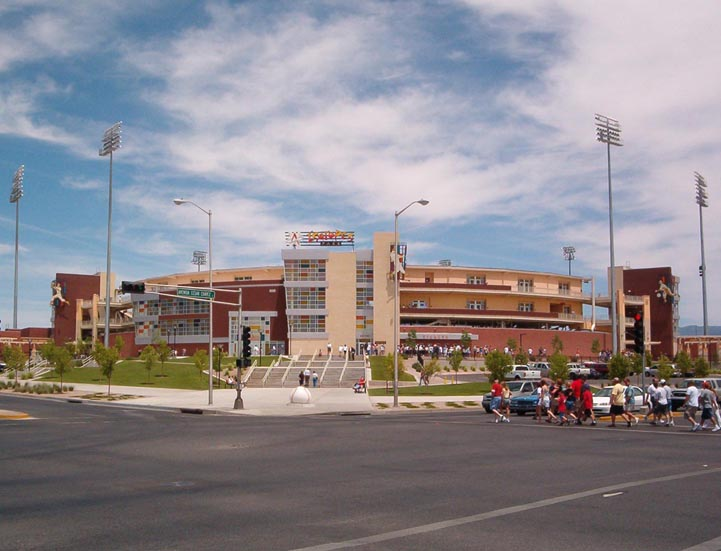
Rio Grande Credit Union Field at Isotopes Park (Albuquerque Isotopes)

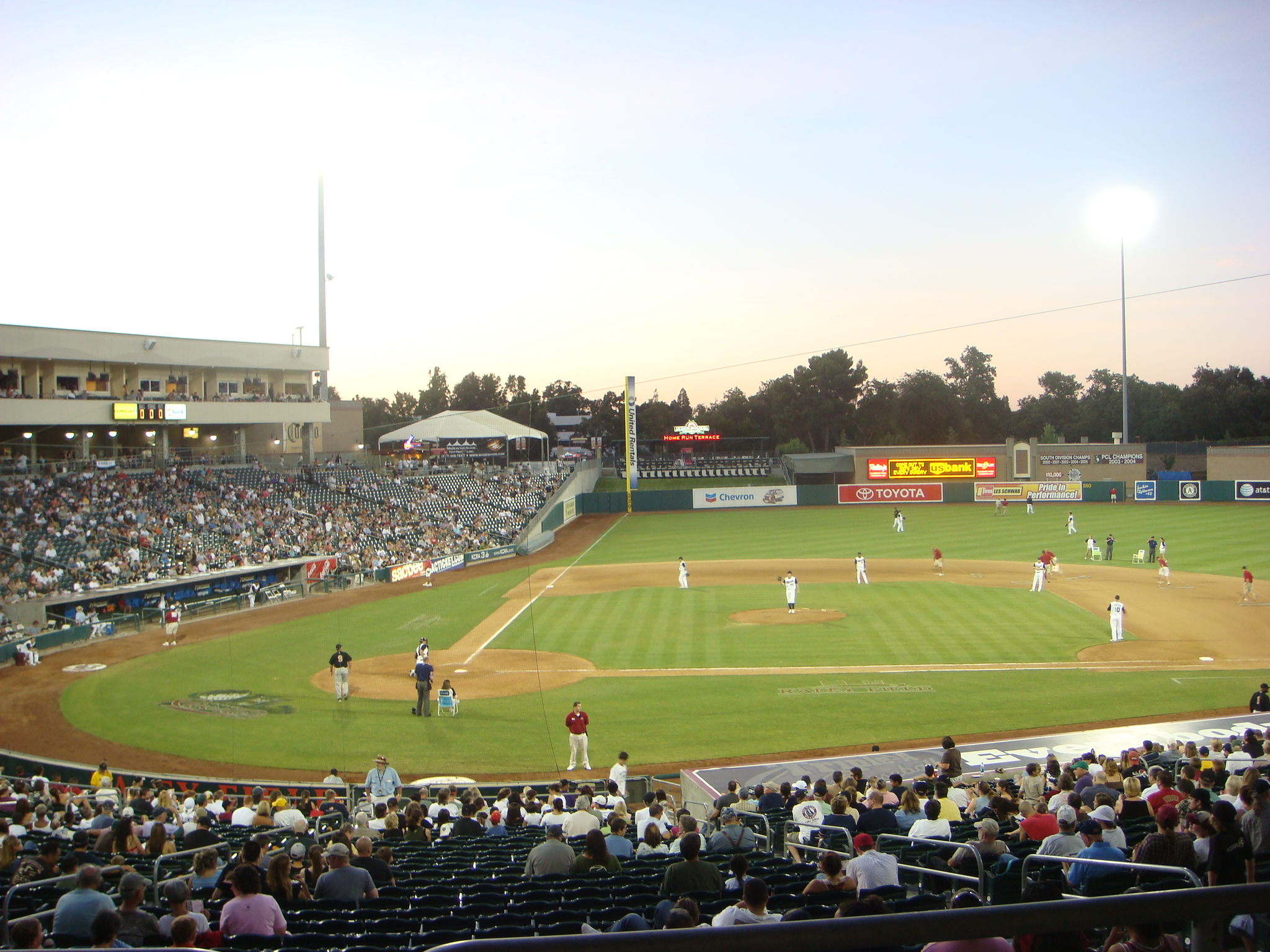
Sutter Health Park (Sacramento River Cats)

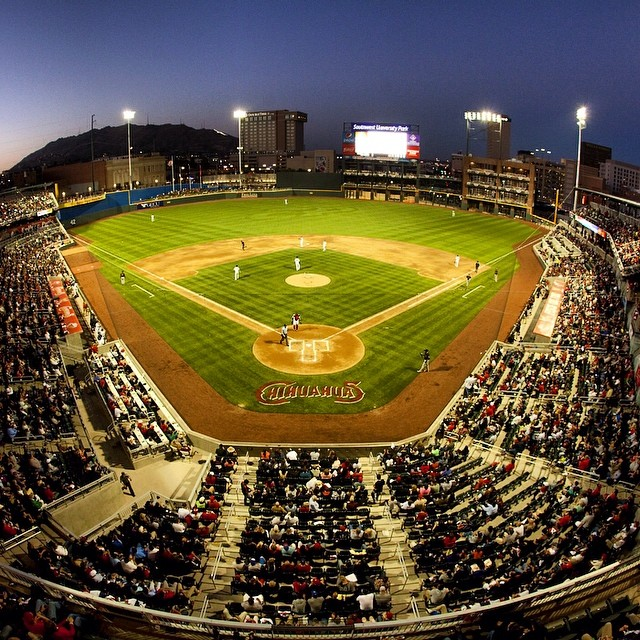
Southwest University Park (El Paso Chihuahuas)

== All stadiums ==
Key
Name	The ballpark's name in its most recent season of hosting PCL baseball
First season	The ballpark's first season of hosting PCL baseball
Last season	The ballpark's last season of hosting PCL baseball

Name	Team(s)	City	State/Province	First season	Last season	Ref(s).
Albuquerque Sports Stadium	Albuquerque Dukes	Albuquerque	New Mexico	1972	2000	
All Sports Stadium	Oklahoma City 89ers	Oklahoma City	Oklahoma	1963	1968	
Aloha Stadium	Hawaii Islanders	Honolulu	Hawaii	1975	1985	
AutoZone Park	Memphis Redbirds	Memphis	Tennessee	2000	2020	
The Ballpark at America First Square	Salt Lake Bees	South Jordan	Utah	2025	–	
Bonneville Park	Salt Lake City Bees	Salt Lake City	Utah	1915	1925	
Burnett Field	Dallas Rangers	Dallas	Texas	1964	1964	
Burns Stadium (Note: Burns Stadium was previously known as Foothills Stadium (1985–1995).)	Calgary Cannons	Calgary	Alberta	1985	2002	
Bush Stadium (Note: Bush Stadium was previously known as Victory Field (1964–1966).)	Indianapolis Indians	Indianapolis	Indiana	1964	1968	
Cashman Field	Las Vegas 51s	Las Vegas	Nevada	1983	2018	
Charles C. Hughes Stadium	Sacramento Solons	Sacramento	California	1974	1976	
Cheney Stadium	Tacoma Giants/Cubs/Twins/Yankees/Tugs/Tigers/Rainiers	Tacoma	Washington	1960	–	
Chickasaw Bricktown Ballpark (Note: Chickasaw Bricktown Ballpark was previously known as Southwestern Bell Bricktown Ballpark, SBC Bricktown Ballpark, AT&T Bricktown Ballpark, RedHawks Field at Bricktown, and Newcastle Field at Bricktown.)	Oklahoma RedHawks; Oklahoma City RedHawks/Dodgers/Baseball Club/Comets	Oklahoma City	Oklahoma	1998	–	
Chukchansi Park	Fresno Grizzlies	Fresno	California	2002	2020	
Chutes Park	Los Angeles Angels	Los Angeles	California	1903	1911	
Civic Stadium	Eugene Emeralds	Eugene	Oregon	1969	1973	
Civic Stadium	Seattle Rainiers	Seattle	Washington	1932	1938	
Constellation Field	Sugar Land Skeeters; Sugar Land Space Cowboys	Sugar Land	Texas	2021	–	
Dell Diamond	Round Rock Express	Round Rock	Texas	2005	–	
Derks Field (Note: Derks Field was previously known as Community Park (1926–1945).)	Salt Lake City Bees (Note: Derks Field was home the Salt Lake City Bees (1958–1965) and Salt Lake City Gulls (1970–1984).); Salt Lake City Gulls	Salt Lake City	Utah	1958	1984	
Dugdale Field	Seattle Indians	Seattle	Washington	1919	1932	
Ewing Field	Mission Wolves (Note: Ewing Field was home to the Mission Wolves, Sacramento Wolves, and San Francisco Seals in 1914.); Sacramento Wolves; San Francisco Seals	San Francisco	California	1914	1914	
Fairgrounds Park	Spokane Indians	Spokane	Washington	1958	1982	
First Horizon Park (Note: First Horizon Park was previously known as First Tennessee Park (2015–2019).)	Nashville Sounds	Nashville	Tennessee	2015	2020	
Freeman's Park	Oakland Oaks	Oakland	California	1903	1912	
Gilmore Field	Hollywood Stars	Hollywood	California	1939	1957	
Greater Nevada Field (Note: Greater Nevada Field was previously known as Aces Ballpark (2009–2015).)	Reno Aces	Reno	Nevada	2009	–	
Herschel Greer Stadium	Nashville Sounds	Nashville	Tennessee	1998	2014	
Hi Corbett Field	Tucson Toros	Tucson	Arizona	1969	1997	
Honolulu Stadium	Hawaii Islanders	Honolulu	Hawaii	1961	1975	
John Affleck Park	Ogden A's	Ogden	Utah	1979	1980	
John Ducey Park (Note: John Ducey Park was previously known as Renfrew Park (1981–1983).)	Edmonton Trappers	Edmonton	Alberta	1981	1994	
Johnny Rosenblatt Stadium	Omaha Royals	Omaha	Nebraska	1998	2010	
Kino Veterans Memorial Stadium (Note: Kino Veterans Memorial Stadium was previously known as Tucson Electric Park (1998–2010).)	Tucson Sidewinders (Note: Kino Veterans Memorial Stadium was home to the Tucson Sidewinders (1998–2008) and Tucson Padres (2011–2013).); Tucson Padres	Tucson	Arizona	1998	2013	
LaGrave Field	Dallas-Fort Worth Rangers	Fort Worth	Texas	1963	1963	
Lane Field	San Diego Padres	San Diego	California	1936	1967	
Las Vegas Ballpark	Las Vegas Aviators	Summerlin	Nevada	2019	–	
Maier Park	Vernon Tigers	Vernon	California	1909	1925	
Mile High Stadium	Denver Bears	Denver	Colorado	1963	1968	
Moreing Field (Note: Moreing Field was previously known as Buffalo Recreation Park (1909–1921), Cardinal Field (1936–1943), Doubleday Park (1944–1945), and Edmonds Park (1946–1960).)	Sacramento Wolves (Note: Moreing Field was home to the Sacramento Wolves (1909–1914) and Sacramento Solons (1918–1960).); Sacramento Solons	Sacramento	California	1909	1960	
Nat Bailey Stadium (Note: Nat Bailey Stadium was previously known as Capilano Stadium (1956–1969).)	Vancouver Mounties (Note: Nat Bailey Stadium was home to the Vancouver Mounties (1956–1962, 1965–1969) and Vancouver Canadians (1978–1999).); Vancouver Canadians	Vancouver	British Columbia	1956	1999	
Nelson W. Wolff Municipal Stadium	San Antonio Missions	San Antonio	Texas	2019	2020	
Oak Park	Sacramento Senators (Note: Oak Park was home to the Sacramento Senators (1903) and Sacramento Sacts (1909).); Sacramento Sacts	Sacramento	California	1903	1909	
Oaks Park	Oakland Oaks	Oakland	California	1913	1955	
Pete Beiden Field	Fresno Grizzlies	Fresno	California	1998	2001	
PGE Park (Note: PGE Park was previously known as Multnomah Stadium (1956–1969) and Portland Civic Stadium (1970–1999).)	Portland Beavers	Portland	Oregon	1956	2010	
Phoenix Municipal Stadium	Phoenix Firebirds	Phoenix	Arizona	1958	1991	
Principal Park	Iowa Cubs	Des Moines	Iowa	1998	2020	
Rainbow Stadium	Hawaii Islanders	Honolulu	Hawaii	1986	1987	
Recreation Park	San Francisco Seals (Note: Recreation Park was home to the San Francisco Seals (1907–1913, 1915–1930) and Mission Reds (1926–1930).); Mission Reds	San Francisco	California	1907	1930	
Recreation Park	Seattle Siwashes	Seattle	Washington	1903	1906	
Rio Grande Credit Union Field at Isotopes Park (Note: Rio Grande Credit Union Field at Isotopes Park was previously known only as Isotopes Park (2003–2019).)	Albuquerque Isotopes	Albuquerque	New Mexico	2003	–	
Riverfront Stadium	Wichita Wind Surge	Wichita	Kansas	1903	1906	
San Diego Stadium	San Diego Padres	San Diego	California	1968	1968	
San Jose Municipal Stadium	San Jose Missions	San Jose	California	1977	1978	
Scottsdale Stadium	Phoenix Firebirds	Scottsdale	Arizona	1992	1997	
Seals Stadium	San Francisco Seals (Note: Seals Stadium was home to the San Francisco Seals (1931–1957) and Mission Reds (1931–1937).); Mission Reds	San Francisco	California	1931	1957	
Security Service Field (Note: Security Service Field was previously known as Sky Sox Stadium (1988–2004).)	Colorado Springs Sky Sox	Colorado Springs	Colorado	1988	2018	
Shrine on Airline (Note: Shrine on Airline was previously known as Zephyr Field (1998–2016).)	New Orleans Baby Cakes	New Orleans	Louisiana	1998	2019	
Sick's Stadium	Seattle Angels	Seattle	Washington	1938	1968	
Smith's Ballpark (Note: Smith's Ballpark was previously known as Franklin Quest Stadium (1994–1998) and Franklin Covey Field (1999–2009), and Spring Mobile Park (2010–2014).)	Salt Lake Buzz; Salt Lake Stingers; Salt Lake Bees	Salt Lake City	Utah	1994	2024	
Southwest University Park	El Paso Chihuahuas	El Paso	Texas	2014	–	
Spurgeon Stadium	Colorado Springs Sky Sox	Colorado Springs	Colorado	1988	1988	
Sutter Health Park (Note: Sutter Health Park was previously known as Raley Field (2000–2019).)	Sacramento River Cats	Sacramento	California	2000	–	
Tacoma Baseball Park	Tacoma Tigers	Tacoma	Washington	1904	1905	
Telus Field (Note: Telus Field was previously known as Edmonton Stadium (1995).)	Edmonton Trappers	Edmonton	Alberta	1995	2004	
Texas League Park	Tulsa Oilers	Tulsa	Oklahoma	1966	1967	
Tim McCarver Stadium	Memphis Redbirds	Memphis	Tennessee	1998	1999	
Travelers Field	Arkansas Travelers	Little Rock	Arkansas	1964	1965	
Vaughn Street Park	Portland Beavers	Portland	Oregon	1903	1955	
Washington Park	Los Angeles Angels (Note: Washington Park was home to the Los Angeles Angels (1911–1925) and Venice Tigers (1913–1914).); Venice Tigers	Los Angeles	California	1911	1925	
Werner Park	Omaha Storm Chasers	Omaha	Nebraska	2011	2020	
Westgate Park	San Diego Padres	San Diego	California	1958	1967	
Wrigley Field	Los Angeles Angels (Note: Wrigley Field was home to both the Los Angeles Angels (1925–1957) and Hollywood Stars (1926–1935, 1938).); Hollywood Stars	Los Angeles	California	1925	1957	

=== Unknown stadiums ===
No information is available as to the ballparks of these teams in these seasons.

Team	City	State	First season	Last season
Fresno Raisin Eaters	Fresno	California	1906	1906
Sacramento?	Sacramento	California	1905	1905
San Francisco Seals	San Francisco	California	1903	1907

=== Maps ===
Pacific Coast League stadium locations in the continental US and Canada
Pacific Coast League stadium location in Hawaii, US

== See also ==
- List of Pacific Coast League teams
- List of American Association (1902–1997) stadiums
- List of International League stadiums
- List of Triple-A baseball stadiums
