= List of Pacific Coast League teams =

From the Pacific Coast League's foundation in 1903, many of its teams relocated, changed names, transferred to different leagues, or ceased operations altogether. For the 2021 season, the league operated as the Triple-A West before switching back to its previous moniker in 2022.

== Teams ==
Key
Team name (#)	A number following a team's name indicates multiple iterations of the team in chronological order.

Team	First season	Last season	City	Fate
Albuquerque Dukes	1972	2000	Albuquerque, New Mexico	Relocated to Portland, Oregon, as the Portland Beavers
Albuquerque Isotopes	2003	—	Albuquerque, New Mexico	Active
Arkansas Travelers	1964	1965	Little Rock, Arkansas	Transferred to the Texas League
Calgary Cannons	1985	2002	Calgary, Alberta	Relocated to Albuquerque, New Mexico, as the Albuquerque Isotopes
Colorado Springs Sky Sox	1988	2018	Colorado Springs, Colorado	Relocated to San Antonio, Texas, as the San Antonio Missions
Dallas Rangers	1964	1964	Dallas, Texas	Relocated to Vancouver, British Columbia, as the Vancouver Mounties
Dallas-Fort Worth Rangers	1963	1963	Dallas, Texas	Renamed the Dallas Rangers
Denver Bears	1963	1968	Denver, Colorado	Transferred to the American Association
Edmonton Trappers	1981	2004	Edmonton, Alberta	Relocated to Round Rock, Texas, as the Round Rock Express
El Paso Chihuahuas	2014	—	El Paso, Texas	Active
Eugene Emeralds	1969	1973	Eugene, Oregon	Relocated to Sacramento, California, as the Sacramento Solons
Fresno Grizzlies	1998	2020 (Note: The Fresno Grizzlies, Iowa Cubs, Memphis Redbirds, Nashville Sounds, Omaha Storm Chasers, and San Antonio Missions last played in the league during the 2019 season, since the 2020 season was cancelled due to the COVID-19 pandemic.)	Fresno, California	Transferred to the California League
Fresno Raisin Eaters	1906	1906	Fresno, California	Transferred to the California League and to Sacramento, California, as the Sacramento Cordovas
Hawaii Islanders	1961	1987	Honolulu, Hawaii	Relocated to Colorado Springs, Colorado, as the Colorado Springs Sky Sox
Hollywood Stars (1)	1926	1935	Hollywood, California	Relocated to San Diego, California, as the San Diego Padres
Hollywood Stars (2)	1938	1957	Hollywood, California	Relocated to Salt Lake City, Utah, as the Salt Lake City Bees
Indianapolis Indians	1964	1968	Indianapolis, Indiana	Transferred to the American Association
Iowa Cubs	1998	2020	Des Moines, Iowa	Transferred to the International League
Las Vegas Aviators	2019	—	Las Vegas, Nevada	Active
Las Vegas 51s	2001	2018	Las Vegas, Nevada	Relocated to Summerlin, Nevada, as the Las Vegas Aviators
Las Vegas Stars	1983	2000	Las Vegas, Nevada	Renamed the Las Vegas 51s
Los Angeles Angels	1903	1957	Los Angeles, California	Relocated to Spokane, Washington, as the Spokane Indians
Memphis Redbirds	1998	2020	Memphis, Tennessee	Transferred to the International League
Mission Bells	1926	1927	San Francisco, California	Renamed the Mission Reds
Mission Reds	1928	1937	San Francisco, California	Relocated to Hollywood, California, as the Hollywood Stars
Mission Wolves	1914	1914	San Francisco, California	Relocated to Salt Lake City, Utah, as the Salt Lake City Bees
Nashville Sounds	1998	2020	Nashville, Tennessee	Transferred to the International League
New Orleans Baby Cakes	2017	2019	New Orleans, Louisiana	Relocated to Wichita, Kansas, as the Wichita Wind Surge
New Orleans Zephyrs	1998	2016	New Orleans, Louisiana	Renamed the New Orleans Baby Cakes
Oakland Commuters	1904	1907	Oakland, California	Renamed the Oakland Oaks
Oakland Oaks	1908	1955	Oakland, California	Relocated to Vancouver, British Columbia, as the Vancouver Mounties
Oakland Recruits	1903	1903	Oakland, California	Renamed the Oakland Commuters
Ogden A's	1979	1980	Ogden, Utah	Relocated to Edmonton, Alberta, as the Edmonton Trappers
Oklahoma City 89ers	1963	1968	Oklahoma City, Oklahoma	Transferred to the American Association
Oklahoma City Baseball Club	2024	2024	Oklahoma City, Oklahoma	Renamed the Oklahoma City Comets
Oklahoma City Comets	2025	—	Oklahoma City, Oklahoma	Active
Oklahoma City Dodgers	2015	2023	Oklahoma City, Oklahoma	Renamed the Oklahoma City Baseball Club
Oklahoma City RedHawks	2009	2014	Oklahoma City, Oklahoma	Renamed the Oklahoma City Dodgers
Oklahoma RedHawks	1998	2008	Oklahoma City, Oklahoma	Renamed the Oklahoma City RedHawks
Omaha Golden Spikes	1999	2001	Omaha, Nebraska	Renamed the Omaha Royals
Omaha Royals (1)	1998	1998	Omaha, Nebraska	Renamed the Omaha Golden Spikes
Omaha Royals (2)	2002	2010	Omaha, Nebraska	Renamed the Omaha Storm Chasers
Omaha Storm Chasers	2011	2020	Omaha, Nebraska	Transferred to the International League
Phoenix Firebirds	1986	1997	Phoenix, Arizona	Relocated to Tucson, Arizona, as the Tucson Sidewinders
Phoenix Giants (1)	1958	1959	Phoenix, Arizona	Relocated to Tacoma, Washington, as the Tacoma Giants
Phoenix Giants (2)	1966	1985	Phoenix, Arizona	Renamed the Phoenix Firebirds
Portland Beavers (1)	1906	1917	Portland, Oregon	Folded
Portland Beavers (2)	1919	1972	Portland, Oregon	Relocated to Spokane, Washington, as the Spokane Indians
Portland Beavers (3)	1978	1993	Portland, Oregon	Relocated to Salt Lake City, Utah, as the Salt Lake Buzz
Portland Beavers (4)	2001	2010	Portland, Oregon	Relocated to Tucson, Arizona, as the Tucson Padres
Portland Browns	1903	1904	Portland, Oregon	Renamed the Portland Giants
Portland Giants	1905	1905	Portland, Oregon	Renamed the Portland Beavers
Reno Aces	2009	—	Reno, Nevada	Active
Round Rock Express	2005	—	Round Rock, Texas	Active
Sacramento	1905	1905	Sacramento, California	Relocated to Fresno, California, as the Fresno Raisin Eaters
Sacramento River Cats	2000	—	Sacramento, California	Active
Sacramento Sacts	1909	1913	Sacramento, California	Renamed the Sacramento Wolves
Sacramento Senators (1)	1903	1903	Sacramento, California	Relocated to Tacoma, Washington, as the Tacoma Tigers
Sacramento Senators (2)	1918	1935	Sacramento, California	Renamed the Sacramento Solons
Sacramento Solons (1)	1936	1960	Sacramento, California	Relocated to Honolulu, Hawaii, as the Hawaii Islanders
Sacramento Solons (2)	1974	1976	Sacramento, California	Relocated to San Jose, California, as the San Jose Missions
Sacramento Wolves	1914	1914	Sacramento, California	Relocated to San Francisco, California, as the Mission Wolves, during the 1914 season
Salt Lake Bees	2006	—	Salt Lake City, Utah	Active
Salt Lake Buzz	1994	2000	Salt Lake City, Utah	Renamed the Salt Lake Stingers
Salt Lake City Angels	1971	1974	Salt Lake City, Utah	Renamed the Salt Lake City Gulls
Salt Lake City Bees (1)	1915	1925	Salt Lake City, Utah	Relocated to Hollywood, California, as the Hollywood Stars
Salt Lake City Bees (2)	1958	1965	Salt Lake City, Utah	Relocated to Tacoma, Washington, as the Tacoma Cubs
Salt Lake City Bees (3)	1970	1970	Salt Lake City, Utah	Renamed the Salt Lake City Angels
Salt Lake City Gulls	1975	1984	Salt Lake City, Utah	Relocated to Calgary, Alberta, as the Calgary Cannons
Salt Lake Stingers	2001	2005	Salt Lake City, Utah	Renamed the Salt Lake Bees
San Antonio Missions	2019	2020	San Antonio, Texas	Transferred to the Texas League
San Diego Padres	1936	1968	San Diego, California	Relocated to Eugene, Oregon, as the Eugene Emeralds
San Francisco Seals	1903	1957	San Francisco, California	Relocated to Phoenix, Arizona, as the Phoenix Giants
San Jose Missions	1977	1978	San Jose, California	Relocated to Ogden, Utah, as the Ogden A's
Seattle Angels	1965	1968	Seattle, Washington	Relocated to Tucson, Arizona, as the Tucson Toros
Seattle Indians	1922	1937	Seattle, Washington	Renamed the Seattle Rainiers
Seattle Rainiers (1)	1919	1921	Seattle, Washington	Renamed the Seattle Indians
Seattle Rainiers (2)	1938	1964	Seattle, Washington	Renamed the Seattle Angels
Seattle Siwashes	1903	1906	Seattle, Washington	Transferred to the Northwest League as the Seattle Indians
Spokane Indians (1)	1958	1971	Spokane, Washington	Relocated to Albuquerque, New Mexico, as the Albuquerque Dukes
Spokane Indians (2)	1973	1982	Spokane, Washington	Relocated to Las Vegas, Nevada, as the Las Vegas Stars
Sugar Land Skeeters	2021	2021	Sugar Land, Texas	Renamed Sugar Land Space Cowboys
Sugar Land Space Cowboys	2022	—	Sugar Land, Texas	Active
Tacoma Cubs	1966	1971	Tacoma, Washington	Renamed Tacoma Twins
Tacoma Giants	1960	1965	Tacoma, Washington	Relocated to Phoenix, Arizona, as the Phoenix Giants
Tacoma Rainiers	1995	—	Tacoma, Washington	Active
Tacoma Tigers (1)	1904	1905	Tacoma, Washington	Relocated to Sacramento, California, and referred to merely as Sacramento, during the 1905 season
Tacoma Tigers (2)	1980	1994	Tacoma, Washington	Renamed Tacoma Rainiers
Tacoma Tugs	1979	1979	Tacoma, Washington	Renamed Tacoma Tigers
Tacoma Twins	1972	1977	Tacoma, Washington	Renamed Tacoma Yankees
Tacoma Yankees	1978	1978	Tacoma, Washington	Renamed Tacoma Tugs
Tucson Padres	2011	2013	Tucson, Arizona	Relocated to El Paso, Texas, as the El Paso Chihuahuas
Tucson Sidewinders	1998	2008	Tucson, Arizona	Relocated to Reno, Nevada, as the Reno Aces
Tucson Toros	1969	1997	Tucson, Arizona	Relocated to Fresno, California, as the Fresno Grizzlies
Tulsa Oilers	1966	1968	Tulsa, Oklahoma	Transferred to the American Association
Vancouver Canadians	1978	1999	Vancouver, British Columbia	Relocated to Sacramento, California, as the Sacramento River Cats
Vancouver Mounties (1)	1956	1962	Vancouver, British Columbia	Relocated to Dallas, Texas, as the Dallas-Fort Worth Rangers
Vancouver Mounties (2)	1965	1969	Vancouver, British Columbia	Relocated to Salt Lake City, Utah, as the Salt Lake City Bees
Venice Tigers	1913	1915	Venice, California	Relocated to Vernon, California, as the Vernon Tigers, during the 1915 season
Vernon Tigers (1)	1909	1912	Vernon, California	Relocated to Venice, California, as the Venice Tigers
Vernon Tigers (2)	1915	1925	Vernon, California	Relocated to San Francisco, California, as the Mission Bells
Wichita Wind Surge (Note: The Wichita Wind Surge did not actually play in the league, since the 2020 season was cancelled due to the COVID-19 pandemic.)	2020	2020	Wichita, Kansas	Transferred to the Texas League

== Maps ==
Pacific Coast League team locations in the continental US and Canada
Pacific Coast League team location in Hawaii, US

== See also ==
- List of Pacific Coast League stadiums
- List of American Association (1902–1997) teams
- List of International League teams
