= List of American Association (1902–1997) stadiums =

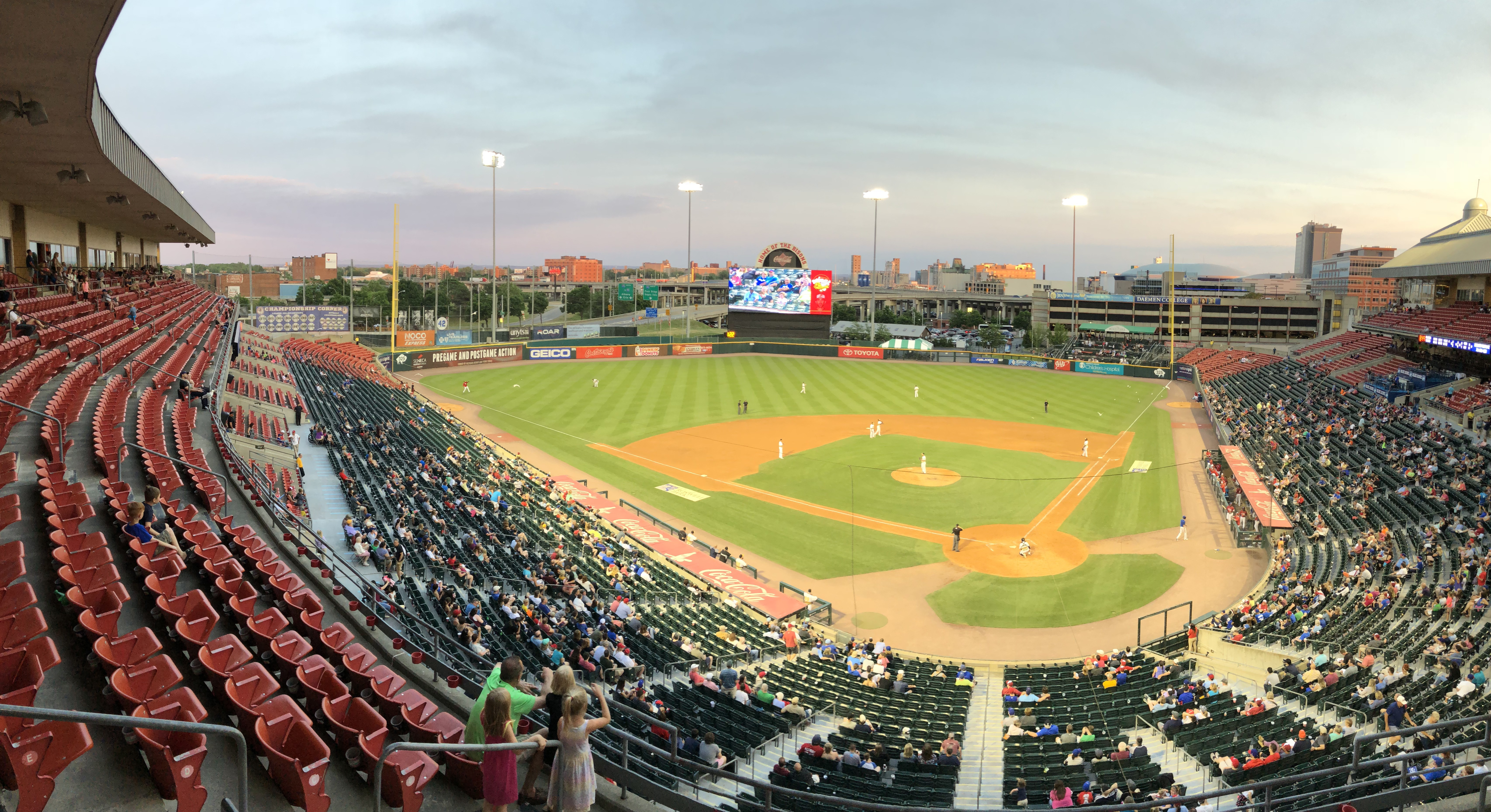
North AmeriCare Park, home of the Buffalo Bisons, now in the International League

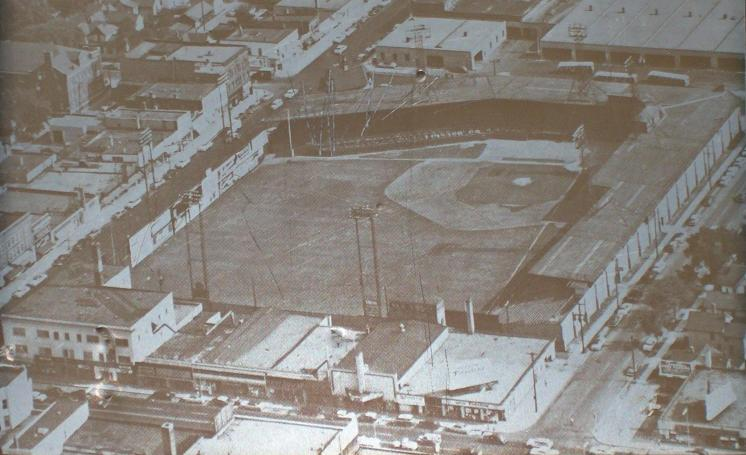
Nicollet Park, former home of the Minneapolis Millers

During the existence of the American Association (AA) from 1902 to 1962 and 1969 to 1997, 42 stadiums located among 26 municipalities are known to have been used by the league. Of the stadiums with known opening dates, the oldest to have hosted AA games was Borchert Field (1888), home of the Milwaukee Brewers; the newest was Zephyr Field (1997), home of the New Orleans Zephyrs. The highest known seating capacity was 62,000 at Superdome, the New Orleans Pelicans home, though it was actually designed for football. The highest capacity of a stadium designed for baseball was 21,698 at Metropolitan Stadium, where the Minneapolis Millers played their home games. The stadium with the lowest known capacity was Central Athletic Park, home of the Columbus Senators, which seated only 3,000.

== Stadiums ==
Key
Name	Stadium's name in its last season of hosting AA baseball
Opened	Opening of earliest stadium variant used for hosting AA baseball
Capacity	Stadium's most recent capacity while hosting AA baseball
†	Denotes stadium active for league's final season

Name	Team(s)	Location	State	Opened	Capacity	Ref(s)
All Sports Stadium †	Oklahoma City 89ers	Oklahoma City	Oklahoma	1958	15,000	
Armory Park	Toledo Mud Hens	Toledo	Ohio	1897	6,900	
Association Park	Kansas City Cowboys, Kansas City Blues	Kansas City	Missouri	1903	10,000	
Borchert Field (Note: Borchert Field was also known as Athletic Park (1888–1894) and Brewer Field (1902–1927).)	Milwaukee Brewers	Milwaukee	Wisconsin	1888	13,000	
Bosse Field	Evansville Triplets	Evansville	Indiana	1915	5,300	
Busch Stadium (Note: Busch Stadium was also known as Buffalo Stadium (1928–1952).)	Houston Buffs	Houston	Texas	1928	11,717	
Cardinal Stadium (Note: Cardinal Stadium was also known as Fairgrounds Stadium (1957–1982).) †	Louisville Colonels, Louisville Redbirds	Louisville	Kentucky	1957	33,500	
Central Athletic Park	Columbus Senators	Columbus	Ohio	1896	3,000	
Downtown Ball Park (Note: Downtown Ball Park was also known as the Pill Box.)	St. Paul Apostles	Saint Paul	Minnesota	1903		
Eagles Stadium (Note: Eagles Stadium was also known as Steer Stadium (1925–1938), Rebel Field (1939–1948), and Burnett Field (1949–1964).)	Dallas/Dallas-Fort Worth Rangers	Dallas	Texas	1924	10,500	
Eclipse Park	Louisville Colonels	Louisville	Kentucky	1902	3,500	
Exposition Park	Kansas City Blues	Kansas City	Missouri		4,000	
Herschel Greer Stadium †	Nashville Sounds	Nashville	Tennessee	1978	11,500	
Johnny Rosenblatt Stadium (Note: Johnny Rosenblatt Stadium was also known as Omaha Baseball Stadium (1948–1955) and Municipal Stadium (1956–1963).) †	Omaha Cardinals, Omaha Dodgers, Omaha Royals	Omaha	Nebraska	1948	17,500	
LaGrave Field (Note: LaGrave Field was originally known as Panther Park (1926–1928).)	Fort Worth Cats, Dallas-Fort Worth Rangers	Fort Worth	Texas	1926	12,000	
Lawrence–Dumont Stadium (Note: Lawrence–Dumont Stadium was also known as Wichita Stadium (1950–1957) and Lawrence Stadium (1958–1977).)	Wichita Braves, Wichita Aeros	Wichita	Kansas	1934	8,500	
League Park IV (Note: League Park IV was also known as Somers Park (1910–1915) and Dunn Field (1916–1927).)	Cleveland Bearcats/Spiders	Cleveland	Ohio	1910	23,000	
Lexington Park	St. Paul Saints/Apostles	Saint Paul	Minnesota	1897	10,000	
Privateer Park	New Orleans Zephyrs	New Orleans	Louisiana	1979	5,000	
Metropolitan Stadium	Minneapolis Millers	Bloomington	Minnesota	1956	21,698	
Midway Stadium	St. Paul Saints	Saint Paul	Minnesota	1957	13,050	
Mile High Stadium (Note: Mile High Stadium was also known as Bears Stadium (1948–1968).)	Denver Bears/Zephyrs	Denver	Colorado	1948	19,000	
Minnehaha Driving Park (Note: Minnehaha Driving Park was used for Sunday games by the Minneapolis Millers.)	Minneapolis Millers	Minneapolis	Minnesota			
Municipal Stadium (Note: Municipal Stadium was also known as Muehlebach Stadium (1923–1936), Ruppert Stadium (1937–1942), and Blues Stadium (1943–1954).)	Kansas City Blues	Kansas City	Missouri	1923	17,476	
Neil Park	Columbus Senators, Columbus Red Birds	Columbus	Ohio	1905	11,000	
Nicollet Park	Minneapolis Millers	Minneapolis	Minnesota	1896	10,000	
North AmeriCare Park (Note: North AmeriCare Park was also known as Pilot Field (1988–1995), Dunn Tire Park (2000–2008), Coca-Cola Field (2009–2018), and is now called Sahlen Field.) †	Buffalo Bisons	Buffalo	New York	1988	19,500	
Owen J. Bush Stadium (Note: Owen J. Bush Stadium was also known as Perry Stadium (1931–1941) and Victory Field (1942–1966).)	Indianapolis Indians	Indianapolis	Indiana	1931	12,934	
Parkway Field (Note: Parkway Field was also known as Colonels Field.)	Louisville Colonels	Louisville	Kentucky	1923	13,496	
Principal Park (Note: Principal Park was also known as Sec Taylor Stadium II (1992–2004).) †	Iowa Cubs	Des Moines	Iowa	1992	10,500	
Red Bird Stadium (Note: Red Bird Stadium was also known as Jets Stadium (1955–1970) and Franklin County Stadium (1977–1984) before being renamed Cooper Stadium (1984).)	Columbus Red Birds	Columbus	Ohio	1932	14,500	
Robin Roberts Stadium (Note: Robin Roberts Stadium was originally known as Lanphier Park.)	Springfield Redbirds	Springfield	Illinois	1925	4,500	
Sec Taylor Stadium (Note: Sec Taylor Stadium was also known as Riverside Park (1947–1948), Pioneer Memorial Stadium (1949–1958), and Sec Taylor Stadium I.)	Iowa Oaks/Cubs	Des Moines	Iowa	1947	8,000	
Superdome (Note: Superdome was also known as Louisiana Superdome (1975–2011) and Mercedes-Benz Superdome (2011–2021) before being renamed Caesars Superdome (2021).)	New Orleans Pelicans	New Orleans	Louisiana	1975	62,000	
Swayne Field (Note: Swayne Field was also known as Mudhen Field.)	Toledo Mud Hens/Iron Men, Toledo Sox	Toledo	Ohio	1909	12,000	
Oiler Park (Note: was also known as Tulsa County Stadium (1934), Texas League Park (1934–1961), before being renamed Driller Park (1977).)	Tulsa Oilers	Tulsa	Oklahoma	1934	7,200	
Victory Field †	Indianapolis Indians	Indianapolis	Indiana	1996	12,500	
War Memorial Stadium (Note: War Memorial Stadium was also known as The Rockpile.)	Buffalo Bisons	Buffalo	New York	1937	45,000	
Washington Street Park (East)	Indianapolis Indians	Indianapolis	Indiana			
Washington Street Park (West) (Note: West Washington Street Park was also known as Riverside Park.)	Indianapolis Indians	Indianapolis	Indiana		5,000	
Watt Powell Park (Note: Watt Powell Park was also known as Exhibition Park.)	Charleston Senators (Note: The Toledo Mud Hens played at Watt Powell Park for the remainder of the 1952 season after moving to Charleston and becoming the Charleston Senators.)	Charleston	West Virginia	1949	5,500	
Zephyr Field (Note: Zephyr Field was also known as Shrine on Airline (2017–2020) before being renamed Gold Mine on Airline (2021).) †	New Orleans Zephyrs	Metairie	Louisiana	1997	10,000	

=== Map ===
American Association stadium locations

== See also ==
- List of American Association (1902–1997) teams
- List of International League stadiums
- List of Pacific Coast League stadiums
- List of Triple-A baseball stadiums
