= List of American Association (1902–1997) teams =

The American Association was a Minor League Baseball league that operated primarily in the Midwestern and South Central United States from 1902 to 1962 and 1969 to 1997. Over that 90-year span, its teams relocated, changed names, transferred to different leagues, or ceased operations altogether. This list documents teams which played in the league.

== Teams ==
Key
Team name (#)	A number following a team's name indicates multiple iterations of the team in chronological order.

Team	First season	Last season	City	Fate
Buffalo Bisons	1985	1997	Buffalo, New York	League disbanded; team transferred to the International League
Charleston Senators	1952	1960	Charleston, West Virginia	Folded
Cleveland Bearcats	1914	1914	Cleveland, Ohio	Renamed the Cleveland Spiders
Cleveland Spiders	1915	1915	Cleveland, Ohio	Relocated to Toledo, Ohio, as the Toledo Iron Men
Columbus Red Birds	1931	1954	Columbus, Ohio	Relocated to Omaha, Nebraska, as the Omaha Cardinals
Columbus Senators	1902	1930	Columbus, Ohio	Renamed the Columbus Red Birds
Dallas Rangers	1959	1959	Dallas, Texas	Merged with the Fort Worth Cats to become the Dallas-Fort Worth Rangers
Dallas-Fort Worth Rangers	1960	1962	Dallas, Texas	League disbanded; team transferred to the Pacific Coast League
Denver Bears (1)	1955	1962	Denver, Colorado	League disbanded; team transferred to the Pacific Coast League
Denver Bears (2)	1969	1983	Denver, Colorado	Renamed the Denver Zephyrs
Denver Zephyrs	1984	1992	Denver, Colorado	Relocated to New Orleans, Louisiana, as the New Orleans Zephyrs
Evansville Triplets	1970	1984	Evansville, Indiana	Relocated to Nashville, Tennessee, as the Nashville Sounds
Fort Worth Cats	1959	1959	Fort Worth, Texas	Merged with the Dallas Rangers to become the Dallas-Fort Worth Rangers
Houston Buffs	1959	1961	Houston, Texas	Relocated to Oklahoma City, Oklahoma, as the Oklahoma City 89ers
Indianapolis Indians (1)	1902	1962	Indianapolis, Indiana	League disbanded; team transferred to the International League
Indianapolis Indians (2)	1969	1997	Indianapolis, Indiana	League disbanded; team transferred to the International League
Iowa Cubs	1982	1997	Des Moines, Iowa	League disbanded; team transferred to the Pacific Coast League
Iowa Oaks	1969	1981	Des Moines, Iowa	Renamed the Iowa Cubs
Kansas City Blues (1)	1902	1902	Kansas City, Missouri	Renamed the Kansas City Cowboys
Kansas City Blues (2)	1904	1954	Kansas City, Missouri	Relocated to Denver, Colorado, as the Denver Bears
Kansas City Cowboys	1903	1903	Kansas City, Missouri	Renamed the Kansas City Blues
Louisville Colonels	1902	1962	Louisville, Kentucky	League disbanded; team folded
Louisville Redbirds	1982	1997	Louisville, Kentucky	League disbanded; team transferred to the International League
Milwaukee Brewers	1902	1952	Milwaukee, Wisconsin	Relocated to Toledo, Ohio, as the Toledo Sox
Minneapolis Millers	1902	1960	Minneapolis, Minnesota	Folded
Nashville Sounds	1985	1997	Nashville, Tennessee	League disbanded; team transferred to the Pacific Coast League
New Orleans Pelicans	1977	1977	New Orleans, Louisiana	Relocated to Springfield, Illinois, as the Springfield Redbirds
New Orleans Zephyrs	1993	1997	New Orleans, Louisiana	League disbanded; team transferred to the Pacific Coast League
Oklahoma City 89ers (1)	1962	1962	Oklahoma City, Oklahoma	League disbanded; team transferred to the Pacific Coast League
Oklahoma City 89ers (2)	1969	1997	Oklahoma City, Oklahoma	League disbanded; team transferred to the Pacific Coast League
Omaha Cardinals	1955	1959	Omaha, Nebraska	Folded
Omaha Dodgers	1961	1962	Omaha, Nebraska	League disbanded; team folded
Omaha Royals	1969	1997	Omaha, Nebraska	League disbanded; team transferred to the Pacific Coast League
Springfield Redbirds	1978	1981	Springfield, Illinois	Relocated to Louisville, Kentucky, as the Louisville Redbirds
St. Paul Apostles	1914	1914	St. Paul, Minnesota	Renamed the St. Paul Saints
St. Paul Saints (1)	1902	1913	St. Paul, Minnesota	Renamed the St. Paul Apostles
St. Paul Saints (2)	1915	1960	St. Paul, Minnesota	Relocated to Omaha, Nebraska, as the Omaha Dodgers
Toledo Iron Men	1916	1918	Toledo, Ohio	Renamed the Toledo Mud Hens
Toledo Mud Hens (1)	1902	1913	Toledo, Ohio	Relocated to Cleveland, Ohio, as the Cleveland Bearcats
Toledo Mud Hens (2)	1919	1952	Toledo, Ohio	Relocated to Charleston, West Virginia, as the Charleston Senators, during the 1952 season
Toledo Sox	1953	1955	Toledo, Ohio	Relocated to Wichita, Kansas, as the Wichita Braves
Tulsa Oilers	1969	1976	Tulsa, Oklahoma	Relocated to New Orleans, Louisiana, as the New Orleans Pelicans
Wichita Aeros	1970	1984	Wichita, Kansas	Relocated to Buffalo, New York, as the Buffalo Bisons
Wichita Braves	1956	1958	Wichita, Kansas	Relocated to Fort Worth, Texas, as the Fort Worth Cats

== Map ==
American Association team locations

== See also ==
- List of American Association (1902–1997) stadiums
- List of International League teams
- List of Pacific Coast League teams
