= List of International League teams =

From the International League's foundation in 1912, many of its teams relocated, changed names, transferred to different leagues, or ceased operations altogether. For the 2021 season, the league operated as the Triple-A East before switching back to its previous moniker in 2022.

== Teams ==
Key
| Team name (#) | A number following a team's name indicates multiple iterations of the team in chronological order. |

| Team | First season | Last season | City | Fate |
|---|---|---|---|---|
| Akron Buckeyes | 1920 | 1920 | Akron, Ohio | Relocated to Newark, New Jersey, as the Newark Bears (2) |
| Albany Senators | 1932 | 1936 | Albany, New York | Relocated to Jersey City, New Jersey, as the Jersey City Giants |
| Arkansas Travelers | 1963 | 1963 | Little Rock, Arkansas | Transferred to the Pacific Coast League |
| Atlanta Crackers | 1962 | 1965 | Atlanta, Georgia | Relocated to Richmond, Virginia, as the Richmond Braves |
| Baltimore Orioles (1) | 1912 | 1914 | Baltimore, Maryland | Relocated to Richmond, Virginia, as the Richmond Climbers |
| Baltimore Orioles (2) | 1916 | 1953 | Baltimore, Maryland | Relocated to Richmond, Virginia, as the Richmond Virginians (2) |
| Binghamton Bingoes | 1918 | 1919 | Binghamton, New York | Relocated to Syracuse, New York, as the Syracuse Stars (2) |
| Buffalo Bisons (1) | 1912 | 1970 | Buffalo, New York | Relocated to Winnipeg, Manitoba, as the Winnipeg Whips, during the 1970 season |
| Buffalo Bisons (2) | 1998 | — | Buffalo, New York | Active |
| Charleston Charlies (1) | 1971 | 1976 | Charleston, West Virginia | Relocated to Columbus, Ohio, as the Columbus Clippers |
| Charleston Charlies (2) | 1977 | 1983 | Charleston, West Virginia | Relocated to Old Orchard Beach, Maine, as the Maine Guides |
| Charleston Marlins | 1961 | 1961 | Charleston, West Virginia | Relocated to Atlanta, Georgia, as the Atlanta Crackers |
| Charlotte Knights | 1993 | — | Charlotte, North Carolina | Active |
| Columbus Clippers | 1977 | — | Columbus, Ohio | Active |
| Columbus Jets | 1955 | 1970 | Columbus, Ohio | Relocated to Charleston, West Virginia, as the Charleston Charlies (1) |
| Durham Bulls | 1998 | — | Durham, North Carolina | Active |
| Gwinnett Braves | 2009 | 2017 | Lawrenceville, Georgia | Renamed the Gwinnett Stripers |
| Gwinnett Stripers | 2018 | — | Lawrenceville, Georgia | Active |
| Hamilton Tigers | 1918 | 1918 | Hamilton, Ontario | Relocated to Reading, Pennsylvania, as the Reading Coal Barons |
| Harrisburg Senators | 1915 | 1915 | Harrisburg, Pennsylvania | Transferred to the New York State League as the Harrisburg Islanders |
| Havana Sugar Kings | 1954 | 1960 | Havana, Cuba | Relocated to Jersey City, New Jersey, as the Jersey City Jerseys, during the 1960 season |
| Indianapolis Indians (1) | 1963 | 1963 | Indianapolis, Indiana | Transferred to the American Association |
| Indianapolis Indians (2) | 1998 | — | Indianapolis, Indiana | Active |
| Iowa Cubs | 2021 | — | Des Moines, Iowa | Active |
| Jacksonville Jumbo Shrimp | 2021 | — | Jacksonville, Florida | Active |
| Jacksonville Suns | 1962 | 1968 | Jacksonville, Florida | Relocated to Norfolk, Virginia, as the Tidewater Tides |
| Jersey City Giants | 1937 | 1950 | Jersey City, New Jersey | Relocated to Ottawa, Ontario, as the Ottawa Giants |
| Jersey City Jerseys | 1960 | 1961 | Jersey City, New Jersey | Relocated to Jacksonville, Florida, as the Jacksonville Suns |
| Jersey City Skeeters (1) | 1912 | 1915 | Jersey City, New Jersey | Relocated to Newark, New Jersey, as the Newark Indians (2) |
| Jersey City Skeeters (2) | 1918 | 1933 | Jersey City, New Jersey | Relocated to Syracuse, New York, as the Syracuse Chiefs (1) |
| Lehigh Valley IronPigs | 2008 | — | Allentown, Pennsylvania | Active |
| Louisville Bats | 2002 | — | Louisville, Kentucky | Active |
| Louisville Colonels | 1968 | 1972 | Louisville, Kentucky | Relocated to Pawtucket, Rhode Island, as the Pawtucket Red Sox (1) |
| Louisville Redbirds | 1998 | 1998 | Louisville, Kentucky | Renamed the Louisville RiverBats |
| Louisville RiverBats | 1999 | 2001 | Louisville, Kentucky | Renamed the Louisville Bats |
| Maine Guides | 1984 | 1987 | Old Orchard Beach, Maine | Renamed the Maine Phillies |
| Maine Phillies | 1988 | 1988 | Old Orchard Beach, Maine | Relocated to Moosic, Pennsylvania, as the Scranton/Wilkes-Barre Red Barons |
| Memphis Blues | 1974 | 1976 | Memphis, Tennessee | Relocated to Charleston, West Virginia, as the Charleston Charlies (2) |
| Memphis Redbirds | 2021 | — | Memphis, Tennessee | Active |
| Miami Marlins | 1956 | 1960 | Miami, Florida | Relocated to San Juan, Puerto Rico, as the San Juan Marlins |
| Montreal Royals (1) | 1912 | 1917 | Montreal, Quebec | Folded |
| Montreal Royals (2) | 1928 | 1960 | Montreal, Quebec | Relocated to Syracuse, New York, as the Syracuse Chiefs (2) |
| Nashville Sounds | 2021 | — | Nashville, Tennessee | Active |
| Newark Bears (1) | 1917 | 1919 | Newark, New Jersey | Relocated to Akron, Ohio, as the Akron Buckeyes |
| Newark Bears (2) | 1921 | 1925 | Newark, New Jersey | Relocated to Providence, Rhode Island, as the Providence Grays (2), during the 1925 season |
| Newark Bears (3) | 1926 | 1949 | Newark, New Jersey | Relocated to Springfield, Massachusetts, as the Springfield Cubs |
| Newark Indians (1) | 1912 | 1915 | Newark, New Jersey | Relocated to Harrisburg, Pennsylvania, as the Harrisburg Senators, during the 1915 season |
| Newark Indians (2) | 1916 | 1916 | Newark, New Jersey | Renamed the Newark Bears (1) |
| Norfolk Tides | 1993 | — | Norfolk, Virginia | Active |
| Omaha Storm Chasers | 2021 | — | Papillion, Nebraska | Active |
| Ottawa Athletics | 1952 | 1954 | Ottawa, Ontario | Relocated to Columbus, Ohio, as the Columbus Jets |
| Ottawa Giants | 1951 | 1951 | Ottawa, Ontario | Renamed the Ottawa Athletics |
| Ottawa Lynx | 1993 | 2007 | Ottawa, Ontario | Relocated to Allentown, Pennsylvania, as the Lehigh Valley IronPigs |
| Pawtucket Red Sox (1) | 1973 | 1975 | Pawtucket, Rhode Island | Renamed the Rhode Island Red Sox |
| Pawtucket Red Sox (2) | 1977 | 2020 (Note: The Pawtucket Red Sox last played in the league during the 2019 season, since the 2020 season was cancelled due to the COVID-19 pandemic.) | Pawtucket, Rhode Island | Relocated to Worcester, Massachusetts, as the Worcester Red Sox |
| Peninsula Whips | 1972 | 1973 | Hampton, Virginia | Relocated to Memphis, Tennessee, as the Memphis Blues |
| Providence Grays (1) | 1912 | 1917 | Providence, Rhode Island | Folded |
| Providence Grays (2) | 1925 | 1925 | Providence, Rhode Island | Relocated to Newark, New Jersey, as the Newark Bears (3) |
| Reading Aces | 1921 | 1922 | Reading, Pennsylvania | Renamed the Reading Keystones |
| Reading Coal Barons | 1919 | 1919 | Reading, Pennsylvania | Renamed the Reading Marines |
| Reading Keystones | 1923 | 1932 | Reading, Pennsylvania | Relocated to Albany, New York, as the Albany Senators, during the 1932 season |
| Reading Marines | 1920 | 1920 | Reading, Pennsylvania | Renamed the Reading Aces |
| Rhode Island Red Sox | 1976 | 1976 | Pawtucket, Rhode Island | Renamed the Pawtucket Red Sox (2) |
| Richmond Braves | 1966 | 2008 | Richmond, Virginia | Relocated to Lawrenceville, Georgia, as the Gwinnett Braves |
| Richmond Climbers | 1915 | 1916 | Richmond, Virginia | Renamed the Richmond Virginians (1) |
| Richmond Virginians (1) | 1917 | 1917 | Richmond, Virginia | Folded |
| Richmond Virginians (2) | 1954 | 1964 | Richmond, Virginia | Relocated to Toledo, Ohio, as the Toledo Mud Hens |
| Rochester Colts | 1921 | 1921 | Rochester, New York | Renamed the Rochester Tribe |
| Rochester Hustlers | 1912 | 1920 | Rochester, New York | Renamed the Rochester Colts |
| Rochester Red Wings | 1928 | — | Rochester, New York | Active |
| Rochester Tribe | 1922 | 1927 | Rochester, New York | Renamed the Rochester Red Wings |
| San Juan Marlins | 1961 | 1961 | San Juan, Puerto Rico | Relocated to Charleston, West Virginia, as the Charleston Marlins, during the 1961 season |
| Scranton/Wilkes-Barre Highlanders | 2027 | — | Moosic, Pennsylvania | Active |
| Scranton/Wilkes-Barre RailRiders | 2013 | 2026 | Moosic, Pennsylvania | Renamed the Scranton/Wilkes-Barre Highlanders |
| Scranton/Wilkes-Barre Red Barons | 1989 | 2006 | Moosic, Pennsylvania | Renamed the Scranton/Wilkes-Barre Yankees |
| Scranton/Wilkes-Barre Yankees | 2007 | 2012 | Moosic, Pennsylvania | Renamed the Scranton/Wilkes-Barre RailRiders |
| Springfield Cubs | 1950 | 1953 | Springfield, Massachusetts | Relocated to Havana, Cuba, as the Havana Sugar Kings |
| St. Paul Saints | 2021 | — | Saint Paul, Minnesota | Active |
| Syracuse Chiefs (1) | 1934 | 1955 | Syracuse, New York | Relocated to Miami, Florida, as the Miami Marlins |
| Syracuse Chiefs (2) | 1961 | 1996 | Syracuse, New York | Renamed the Syracuse SkyChiefs |
| Syracuse Chiefs (3) | 2007 | 2018 | Syracuse, New York | Renamed the Syracuse Mets |
| Syracuse Mets | 2019 | — | Syracuse, New York | Active |
| Syracuse SkyChiefs | 1997 | 2006 | Syracuse, New York | Renamed the Syracuse Chiefs (3) |
| Syracuse Stars (1) | 1918 | 1918 | Syracuse, New York | Relocated to Hamilton, Ontario, as the Hamilton Tigers, during the 1918 season |
| Syracuse Stars (2) | 1920 | 1927 | Syracuse, New York | Relocated to Montreal, Quebec, as the Montreal Royals (2) |
| Tidewater Tides | 1969 | 1992 | Norfolk, Virginia | Renamed the Norfolk Tides |
| Toledo Mud Hens | 1965 | — | Toledo, Ohio | Active |
| Toronto Maple Leafs | 1912 | 1967 | Toronto, Ontario | Relocated to Louisville, Kentucky, as the Louisville Colonels |
| Winnipeg Whips | 1970 | 1971 | Winnipeg, Manitoba | Relocated to Hampton, Virginia as the Peninsula Whips |
| Worcester Red Sox | 2021 | — | Worcester, Massachusetts | Active |

== Maps ==
International League team location in Manitoba, Canada
International League team US and Canada locations
International League team Caribbean locations

== See also ==
- List of International League stadiums
- List of American Association (1902–1997) teams
- List of Pacific Coast League teams
