= Edmonds Field =

Defunct baseball venue in Sacramento, California

Coordinates: 38.56288°N 121.49823°W

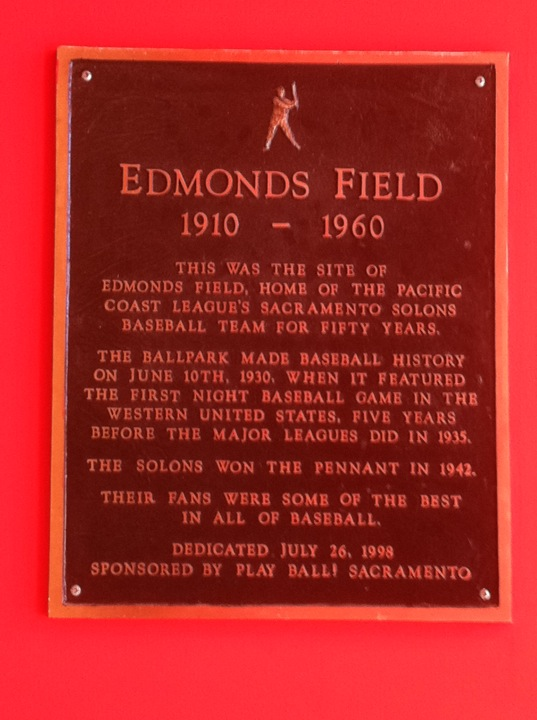
Dedication plaque placed at the site in 1998

Edmonds Field was home to the Sacramento Solons, the Pacific Coast League AAA team from 1910 through 1960, after which they moved to Hawaii. The field was located at the southeast corner of Broadway (originally Y Street) to the north (third base); Riverside Boulevard (originally 11th Street) to the west (first base); and First Avenue to the south (right field).

== History ==
The ballpark opened in 1910, after the ball club abandoned their 1909 home at the Oak Park Recreation Grounds (later known as McClatchy Park). After some exhibition games, the Sacramento Senators opened the park to regular-season Pacific Coast League play on March 30, thumping the Oakland Oaks 18–2.[Sacramento Star, March 30, 1910, p. 9]

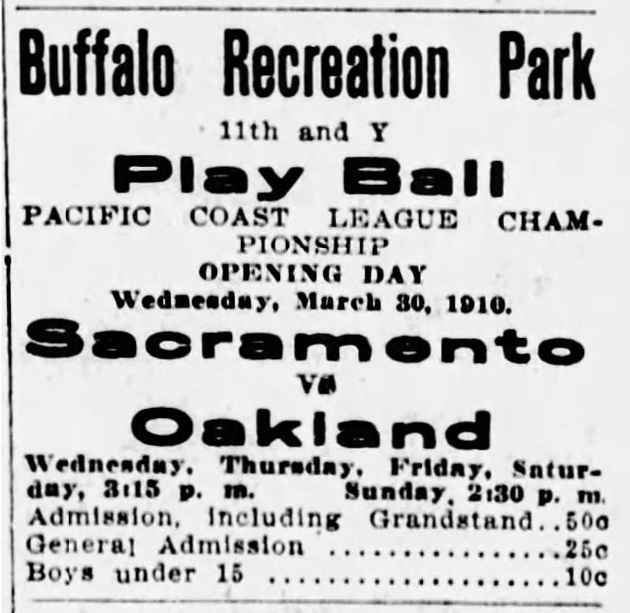
Ad for PCL opener 1910

The park was known by several names during its existence. Initially it was called Buffalo Recreation Park or just Buffalo Park, after the Buffalo Brewing Company, which owned the ball club and the park.

By the 1920s the new owner of ball club and ball field was Lew Moreing. For the 1922 season, the park was substantially rebuilt, and renamed Moreing Field. It was on his watch that the first Solons night game (also the first night game in the PCL) was played, on June 10, 1930. As with the 1910 opener, the Oaks were the victims, this time 8–0.[Sacramento Bee June 11, 1930, pp. 1 and 24]

For 1936, the St. Louis Cardinals acquired the club and park, and renamed the park Cardinal Field in March.[Sacramento Bee, March 9, 1936, p. 18] That name stuck for the next eight seasons.

After the departure of Cardinals' ownership, the ballpark was renamed Doubleday Park, after the mythical "inventor" of baseball, Abner Doubleday.[Sacramento Bee, March 15, 1944, p. 10]

The Solons struggled financially, and were at risk of being transferred to another city. Local sports editor Dick Edmonds championed their cause, raising enough money to stabilize the ball club. He died after a bout with pneumonia, on July 20, 1945, at age 31. His final resting place was in a cemetery across the street from the ballpark. On September 9, the name of the ballpark was officially changed to Edmonds Field in his honor.[Sacramento Bee, September 10, 1945, p. 18]

Disaster struck on July 11, 1948, when the old wooden ballpark was destroyed by fire. The Solons were compelled to finish their schedule on the road. Edmonds Field was rebuilt in the off-season and reopened the following spring. The new main stand was a single uncovered deck, built of concrete. The one piece remaining from the older structure was a small, covered bleacher section in the left field corner, which had escaped destruction due to a gap between it and the main stand.

The Solons had been reprieved again. But they had rarely been successful on the field, and continued to struggle financially through the 1950s. The team was finally sold, and moved to Hawaii for 1961.

On April 12, 1964, prior to it being demolished to make way for a Gemco discount store, the last baseball game played there was an exhibition match between the San Francisco Giants and the Cleveland Indians. That game featured back-to-back home runs by Willie Mays and Willie McCovey, both hit over the towering wall in left field.[Sacramento Bee, April 13, 1964, p.B1]

A Target Store currently occupies the footprint of the former field and there is a plaque in the parking lot in the vicinity of where home plate used to sit.

The ballpark's outfield was essentially a square. The park's final dimensions were: left field 326 ft (99.4 m), center field 463 ft (141.1 m), right field 326 ft (99.4 m).[Michael Benson, Ballparks of North America, McFarland & Company, 1989, p. 345]
