= LaGrave Field =

Abandoned baseball park in Fort Worth, Texas

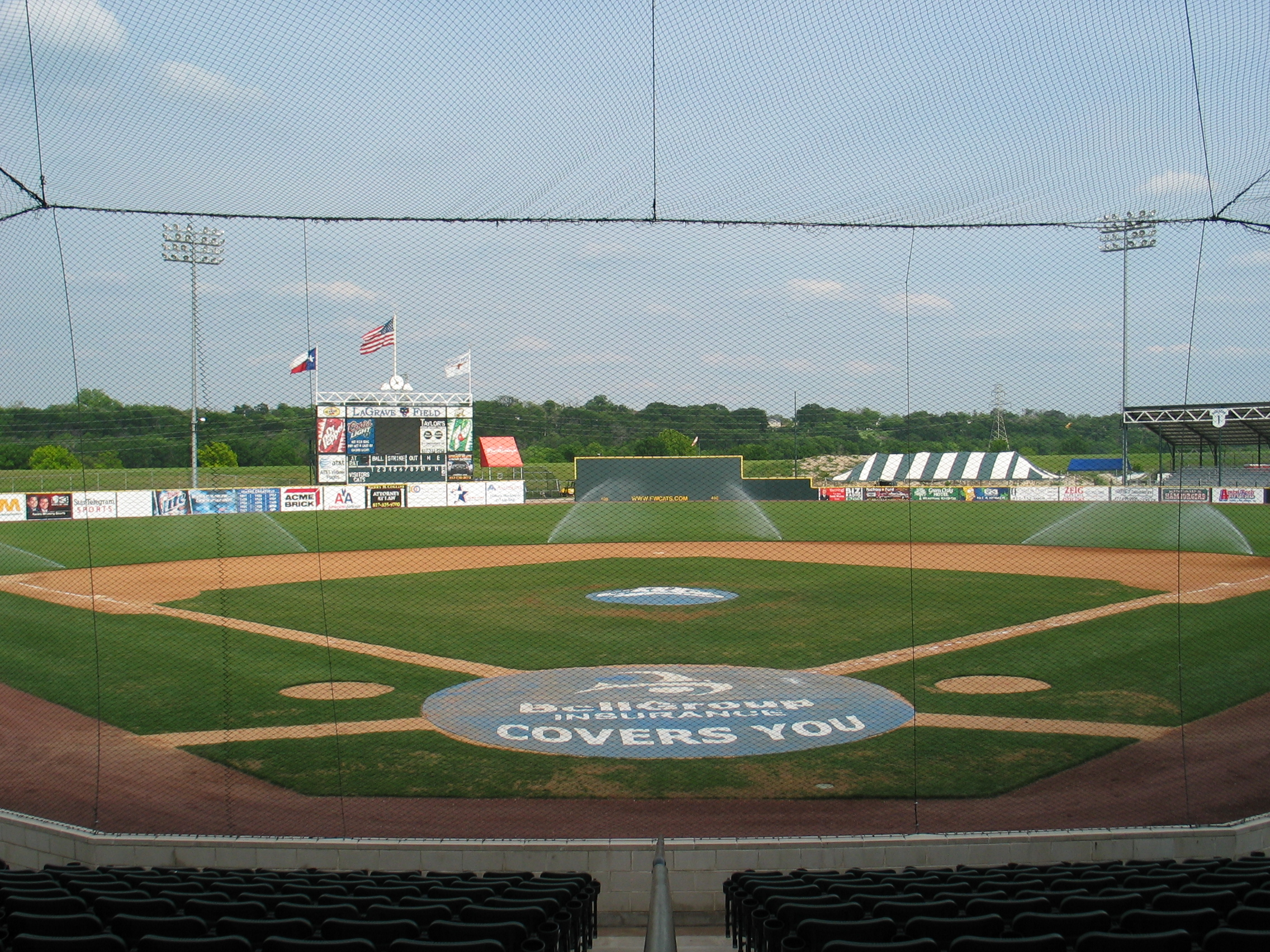
- LaGrave Field in 2007

- Location within Texas Location within the United States
- Interactive map of LaGrave Field
- Address: 301 NE 6th St; Fort Worth, TX 76106
- Coordinates: 32°46′08.48″N 97°20′12.30″W
- Owner: FW Stadium Group, LLC
- Capacity: 4,100 fixed seats (2002)
- Surface: Grass
- Field size: Left Field – 325 ft (99.1 m); Center Field – 400 ft (121.9 m); Right Field – 335 ft (102.1 m)

Construction
- Groundbreaking: December 3, 2001
- Opened: May 23, 2002
- Cost: $4 million USD
- Architect: Anglea Sports Fields

Tenants
- Fort Worth Cats (UBL) 2002–2014; Texas Wesleyan Rams (RRAC); Fort Worth Vaqueros FC (NPSL) 2014

LaGrave Field was a baseball park in Fort Worth, Texas. It was primarily used for baseball and was the home field of the Fort Worth Cats independent minor league baseball team. Its original version was the home of the predecessor Panthers/Cats team of the Texas League from 1926–1958; the American Association in 1959; and then in the Texas League again in 1964. It also served as the part-time home of the Dallas Rangers during 1960–1962. The ballpark was rebuilt during 2001 and opened in 2002 after the club played one season at Lon Goldstein Field.

The ballpark sat on land bounded by a parking lot and then North Calhoun Street (southwest, first base); Northeast 6th Street (if extended) (southeast, right field); Northeast 7th Street (if extended) (northwest, third base); and the banks of a branch of the Trinity River (northeast, left field). The imaginary line running from home plate through second base runs roughly east-southeast.

During the team's inaugural 2014 season, LaGrave Field hosted home games for the Fort Worth Vaqueros FC of the National Premier Soccer League.

The ballpark was condemned in 2024, and demolition began in February 2025.

== History ==
LaGrave Field opened in 1926 replacing Panther Park, which had been opened in 1911, and was located on the "west side of North Main Street, a few blocks from" the eventual LaGrave Field. Panther Park, in turn, had replaced Haines Park, located on the southeast corner of Pine Street and Pacific (now Presidio) Street (per city directories).

After winning consecutive Texas League championships during 1919–1925, the club owners decided to build a new ballpark, which was named for the club's principal owner, Paul LaGrave. It turns out that the last year of the old ballpark was also the last year of the Panthers/Cats string of league titles, but the club would go on to win several more league titles in the 1930s and 1940s.

Early in the 1949 season, on May 15–16, the ballpark was attacked on several fronts by a destructive fire and then rains and floods. The ballpark was rebuilt and rededicated in time for the 1950 season.

After baseball left the city in 1965, the site languished for years, but parts of it remained. When the site was rebuilt during 2001, the original dugouts were retained and renovated as dugout suites, making LaGrave the only ballpark in America to house "four dugouts". The original location of home plate was also retained.

Even at that, the ballpark was planned to be only a temporary site, to be replaced by an $8 million stadium owned by the Fort Worth Sports Authority; however that plan never materialized, due to soil contamination and water pollution at the city-owned site

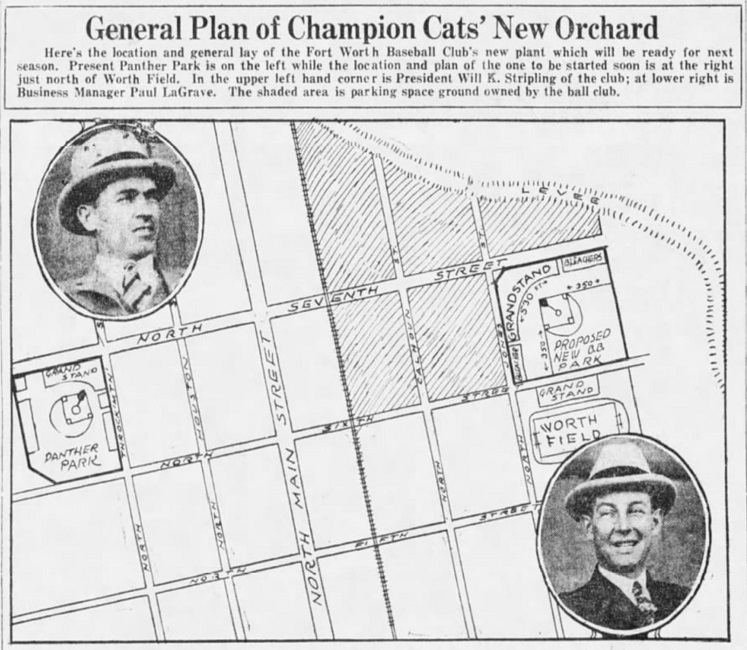
Old and new Panther Parks in 1925 newspaper – Paul LaGrave shown lower right

=== Recent financial challenges ===
In February 2010, former Fort Worth Cats owner Carl Bell defaulted on $30 million in notes with LaGrave Field as collateral. Although Amegy Bank had the right to foreclose on the field and some of the adjacent acreage, the bank did not decide to immediately exercise that right. Former owner Bell also owed over $195,000 in property taxes and penalties for 2010 and sought a buyer for the stadium

A scheduled (January 3, 2012) foreclosure auction was averted due to a Chapter 11 Bankruptcy filing by LaGrave Reconstruction Company Several months later, the debt holder Amegy Bank of Houston finally completed foreclosure and became the landlord of the Cats.

On Tuesday, October 2, 2012, it was announced that LaGrave Field had been bought by an affiliate of the team's new ownership group for $4.5 million USD. The Cats eventually folded following the 2014 season. The facility has since been abandoned and vandalized, and in July 2017 the park suffered a fire in a concession stand.

=== Demolition ===
In June 2024, the Tarrant Regional Water District board voted to tear down the stadium. The water district included $200,000 for demolition in its 2025 budget. Demolition began in February 2025.

== Members of Baseball's Hall of Fame ==
A sign outside the field states the following information:

Nearly 50 members of The Baseball Hall of Fame in Cooperstown have played at LaGrave Field throughout the years
Hank Aaron	Leo Durocher	Johnny Mize
Sparky Anderson	Bob Feller	Stan Musial
Luke Appling	Charlie Gehringer	Herb Pennock
Richie Ashburn	Chick Hafey	Pee Wee Reese
Yogi Berra	Harry Heilmann	Brooks Robinson
Jim Bottomley	Rogers Hornsby	Jackie Robinson
Lou Boudreau	Carl Hubbell	Babe Ruth
Roy Campanella	Monte Irvin	Red Schoendienst
Earl Combs	Ralph Kiner	George Sisler
Kiki Cuyler	Tony Lazerri	Duke Snider
Bill Dickey	Bob Lemon	Warren Spahn
Joe DiMaggio	Heine Manush	Pie Traynor
Larry Doby	Eddie Mathews	Lloyd Waner
Bobby Doerr	Willie Mays	Paul Waner
Don Drysdale	Willie McCovey	Dick Williams
		Ted Williams

== Additional uses ==
- The southeast end of the stadium's parking lot serves as an official parking area for the Tarrant County Courthouse.
- Texas Wesleyan University, an NAIA University also in Fort Worth, played home games at LaGrave Field.
- LaGrave Field also hosted various community events such as outdoor concerts, Boy Scout campouts and auto swap meets.
