= Sacramento Solons =

Defunct American professional baseball team

- 1883–1976; (1883, 1885–1891, 1893–1894, 1898–1904, 1906–1914, 1918–1960, 1974–1976); Sacramento, California

Team logo	Cap insignia

Minor league affiliations
- Previous classes: Triple-A (1958–1960, 1974–1976); Open/non-affiliated (1952–1957); Triple-A (1946–1951); Double-A (1912–1914, 1918–1945); Class A (1909–1911); Independent (1902–1904, 1906–1908); Class E (1899); Class D (1898)
- League: Pacific Coast League (1909–1914, 1918–1960, 1974–1976)
- Previous leagues: California League (1906–1908); California State League (1904, 1906); Pacific Coast League (1903); California League (1898–1902); Pacific Coast League (1898); California Players' League (1894); California League (1889–1893); California State League (1888); California League (1886–1887); California State League (1883, 1885)

Major league affiliations
- Previous teams: Texas Rangers (1976); Milwaukee Brewers (1974–1975); Milwaukee Braves (1959–1960); "open team" non-affiliated (1952–1956); Chicago White Sox (1949–1951); St. Louis Cardinals (1936–1944); Brooklyn Dodgers (1935)

Minor league titles
- League titles: 1938, 1939

Team data
- Previous names: Sacramento Solons (1936–1960, 1974–1976); Sacramento Senators (1918–1935); Mission Wolves (1914); Sacramento Wolves (1914); Sacramento Sacts (1909–1913); Sacramento Senators (1908); Sacramento Cordovas (1906–1907); Sacramento (1904); Sacramento Senators (1903); Sacramento Gilt Edges (1902); Sacramento Senators (1901); Sacramento Gilt Edges (1894, 1898–1900); Sacramento Senators (1893); Stockton River Pirates (1893); Sacramento Senators (1890–1891); Sacramento Altas (1889); Sacramento (1888); Sacramento Altas (1887); Sacramento (1886); Sacramento Union (1885); Sacramento (1883)
- Previous parks: Hughes Stadium (1974–1976); Edmonds Field (1936–1960) (called Cardinal Field and Doubleday Park at various times); Sacramento Baseball Park (1934–1935); Moreing Park (1922–1933); Buffalo Park (1910–1914, 1918–1921); Oak Park (1903, 1908–1909); Snowflake Park (1893)

The Sacramento Solons were a Minor League Baseball team based in Sacramento, California. They played in the Pacific Coast League during several periods (1903, 1905, 1909–1914, 1918–1960, 1974–1976). The current Sacramento River Cats began play in 2000.

== Nickname ==
The team derived its name from Sacramento's status as capital of California. Solon was an early Greek lawmaker and the term "solons" was often used by journalists as a synonym for "senators." Solon Huntington was a prominent Sacramento businessman during the 19th century, though less famous than his brother (Collis Huntington) and son (Henry Huntington).The team was also known at times as the Sacramento Sacts, an abbreviation of the name of the city, and the Sacramento Senators. During 1913-1914, when Harry Wolverton managed the team, San Francisco newspapers often tagged them the Wolves, a nickname which continued when they moved to San Francisco and became the Mission team.

== Early years ==
A Sacramento team played 1900–1902 in 1899–1902 iteration of the California League. This team was called the Senators, but also the Gilt Edges. That team then became a charter member to the Pacific Coast League (PCL) in 1903, called the Sacramento Solons (also known as the Sacts or the Senators). Other teams forming the PCL were the Los Angeles Angels, Portland Beavers, Oakland Oaks, San Francisco Seals and Seattle Indians. Although the Solons finished second in the inaugural year, attendance was not good and the team moved to Tacoma for the 1904 season, renamed the Tacoma Tigers. The Tigers won the PCL pennant in 1904 and won the first half of the split 1905 season. The team lost the 1905 postseason series to the Angels.

The Tacoma team moved to Fresno in 1906, renamed the Fresno Raisin Eaters, then returned to Sacramento in 1907, where it played in the California League for the next three seasons. The Solons returned to the PCL in 1909, but were mired in the second division for the next few years. In 1914, attendance was so bad that the Solons moved to San Francisco in the middle of the season, finishing out the year as the San Francisco Missions. The team was sold to Salt Lake City businessman Bill "Hardpan" Lane after that season and moved there for the 1915 season, renamed the Salt Lake City Bees.

== Heyday ==
When Portland dropped out of the league after the 1917 season, a new Sacramento franchise was admitted to the PCL in 1918. For most of its existence, the Sacramento team finished in the second division, but there were a few bright spots. Originally known as the Senators, the team was purchased by Branch Rickey in 1935 and renamed the Sacramento Solons. Rickey's close friend and business partner Philip Bartelme served as the Solons' president from 1936 to 1944. The Solons finished first in 1937 but lost the postseason series to the San Diego Padres. In 1942 the Solons won their first – and only – Pacific Coast League pennant.

These were the glory years of the Pacific Coast League, during which it was unrivaled for the attention of West Coast baseball fans. The Solons drew reasonably well when featured opponents included teams from Los Angeles, Hollywood, San Francisco and Oakland. However, in 1957, the Brooklyn Dodgers and New York Giants moved to California, forcing the aforementioned teams to move to Spokane, Salt Lake City, Phoenix and Vancouver, respectively. Although the Solons were not immediately displaced, the close proximity of the San Francisco Giants (just over an hour to the south) also took its toll on attendance.

A proposed sale to John Ducey for relocating the Solons to Edmonton was declined in 1959, since the team was independent without financial assistance as a Major League farm team. After the 1960 season, the team was sold and moved to Honolulu and renamed the Hawaii Islanders for 1961.

== Minor league return ==
The third version of the Sacramento Solons began during the AAA realignment in 1969 as the Eugene Emeralds. After the 1973 season, it was determined that Eugene was too small to support PCL baseball, and the team was moved to Sacramento for the 1974 season, taking the name of its predecessor teams, the Sacramento Solons. The Solons' old stadium, Edmonds Field, had long since been demolished. The only available facility was 23,500-seat Hughes Stadium, a football facility, the dimensions of which made the stadium a hitter's paradise. Left field, in particular, was less than the regulation minimum 250 feet from home plate. Despite two consecutive last place finishes, the Solons led the PCL in attendance due to the home run barrage. The Solons changed affiliations and the Texas Rangers refused to allow their top prospects to play in the decrepit Hughes Stadium with its bandbox dimensions. The Solons' owners "leased" the team to San Jose for the 1977 and 1978 seasons, when the team was known as the San Jose Missions, in hopes of obtaining a new baseball-only facility. After two seasons of dismal attendance in San Jose, the team was sold and moved to Ogden, Utah, for the 1979 season.

The Pacific Coast League returned to the capital city in 2000 when a group of area businessmen led by majority owner Art Savage purchased the Vancouver Canadians of the PCL and moved the team to Sacramento. Forgoing the traditional name of Sacramento baseball teams, the owners named the team the Sacramento River Cats. Unlike their predecessors, who were often troubled at the box office, the River Cats have been among the leaders in Minor League Baseball attendance since their return to Sacramento, and leading all minor league teams in attendance for their first nine consecutive years in Sacramento. The River Cats took up residence at the newly built Raley Field, which was constructed specifically for baseball.

== Affiliations ==
The Solons were affiliated with the following major league teams:

Year	Affiliation(s)
1936–1944	St. Louis Cardinals
1949–1951	Chicago White Sox
1959–1960	Milwaukee Braves
1974–1975	Milwaukee Brewers
1976	Texas Rangers

== Gallery ==
Agricultural Park racetrack (1890s)

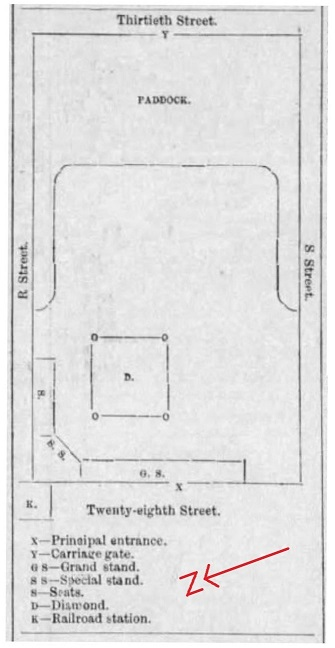
Diagram of Snowflake Park (1887)

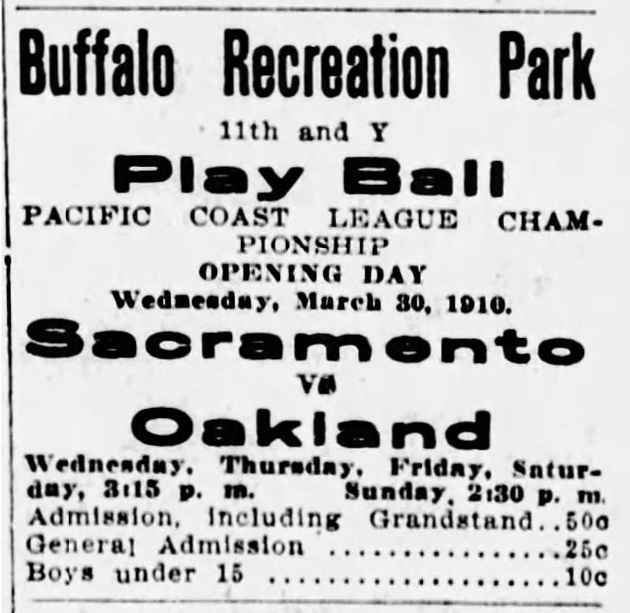
Ad for PCL opener (1910)
