= Fresno Raisin Eaters =

- 1906; Fresno, California

Minor league affiliations
- Previous classes: Class A (1906)
- League: Pacific Coast League (1906)

Team data
- Previous names: Fresno Raisin Eaters (1906)

The Fresno Raisin Eaters were a minor league baseball team which played in the Pacific Coast League in 1906. The Sacramento Solons, a charter member of the PCL which began play in 1903, moved to Tacoma in 1904, where the team won the PCL pennant playing as the Tacoma Tigers. Owner Mike Fisher then moved the team to Fresno for the 1906 season.

A crowd of 2,500 (considered large by the standards of the day) greeted the Raisin Eaters for their home opener against the Portland Beavers, which Portland won, 1-0. That was the high-water mark of the season, as fan support eroded as a result of the team's poor play.

The Raisin Eaters finished dead last in the six-team league, with a record of 64-117 (.353). The one-year wonders dropped out of the PCL after that year, returned to Sacramento, and re-entered the League in 1909 as the Sacramento Solons once more.

Although Fresno would field teams in the California State League and the California League in subsequent years (most notably the Fresno Cardinals) and the Fresno Giants, the Pacific Coast League would not return to Fresno for another 92 years, when the Fresno Grizzlies were admitted to the league in 1998.

During the 2006 season, the Grizzlies honored the 100th anniversary of their short-lived PCL predecessors in Fresno by wearing Raisin Eaters jerseys on the field during each Wednesday home game.
