= Pacific Coast League =

Triple-A baseball league in the Western U.S.

- Upcoming season or competition: 2026 Pacific Coast League season
- Classification: Triple-A (1958–present); Open (1952–1957); Triple-A (1946–1951); Double-A (1912–1945); Class-A (1904–1911); Independent (1903)
- Sport: Baseball
- Founded: 1903 (123 years ago)
- No. of teams: 10
- Country: United States
- Most recent champion: Oklahoma City Comets (2026)
- Most titles: San Francisco Seals (14)

The Pacific Coast League (PCL) is a Minor League Baseball league that operates in the Western United States. Along with the International League, it is one of two leagues playing at the Triple-A level, which is one grade below Major League Baseball (MLB).

The PCL was one of the premier regional baseball leagues in the first half of the 20th century. Although it was never recognized as a true major league, to which it aspired, its quality of play was considered very high. A number of top stars of the era, including Joe DiMaggio and Ted Williams, were products of the league. In 1958, with the arrival of major league teams on the west coast and the availability of televised major league games, the PCL's modern era began with each team signing Player Development Contracts to become farm teams of major league clubs. Following MLB's reorganization of the minor leagues in 2021, it operated as the Triple-A West for one season before switching back to its previous moniker in 2022.

A league champion is determined at the end of each season. The San Francisco Seals won 14 Pacific Coast League titles, the most in the league's history, followed by the Los Angeles Angels (12) and the Albuquerque Dukes and Portland Beavers (8).

== History ==
=== Formation and early history ===
The Pacific Coast League was formed on December 29, 1902, when officials from the California State League (1899–1902) met in San Francisco for the purpose of expanding the league beyond California. Six franchises were granted. These were the Los Angeles Angels, Oakland Oaks, Portland Beavers, Sacramento Senators, San Francisco Seals, and Seattle Indians. A dispute over territories owned by the Pacific Northwest League, in which the PCL had placed franchises, and the PCL's allowing blacklisted players to compete led to the National Association of Professional Baseball Leagues (NAPBL) labeling the PCL an outlaw league.

The mild climate of the West Coast, especially California, allowed the league to play longer seasons, sometimes starting in late February and ending as late as the beginning of December. During the 1905 season the San Francisco Seals set the all-time PCL record by playing 230 games. Teams regularly played between 170 and 200 games in a season until the late 1950s. This allowed players, who were often career minor leaguers, to hone their skills, earn an extra month or two of pay, and reduce the need to find off-season work. These longer seasons gave owners the opportunity to generate more revenue. Another outcome was that a number of the all-time minor league records for season statistical totals are held by players from the PCL.

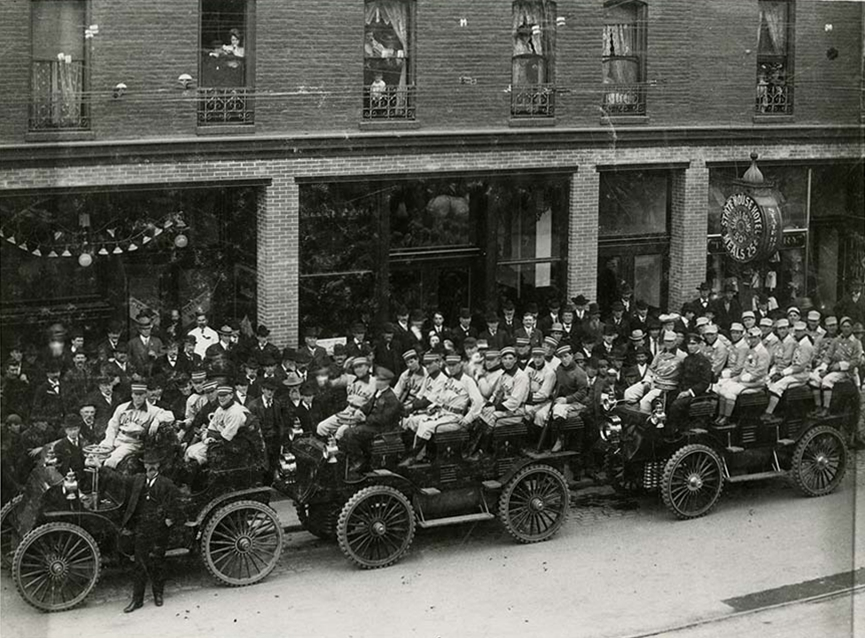
The visiting Oakland Oaks prepare to travel to the ballpark on Opening Day 1903 to face the Sacramento Senators.

The inaugural 1903 season, which consisted of over 200 scheduled games for each team, began on March 26. The Los Angeles Angels finished the season in first place with a 133–78 (.630) record, making them the first league champions.

In 1904, NAPBL president Patrick T. Powers brokered terms with the PCL, clearing it of its outlaw status and designating it as a Class A league. In 1909, the league classification was raised to Double-A. In 1919, with the earlier addition of the Salt Lake City Bees and Vernon Tigers, league membership reached eight teams for the first time. While the league had experienced little commercial success up to this point, the 1920s were a turning point which saw increased attendance and teams fielding star players.

The Great Depression of the 1930s resulted in a lower quality of play due to the league's salary reduction. Still, a number of top stars, including Joe DiMaggio, Ted Williams, Bobby Doerr, and Ox Eckhardt, competed on PCL teams that decade. Also helping attendance was the introduction of night games. At Sacramento's Moreing Field, the Sacramento Solons and the Oakland Oaks played the first night baseball game, five years before any major league night game, on June 10, 1930. The Hollywood Stars and San Diego Padres were added to the league in the 1930s as well.

=== A near-major league ===
During the first half of the 20th century, the Pacific Coast League developed into one of the premier regional baseball leagues. The cities enfranchised by the other two high-minor leagues, the International League and the American Association, were generally coordinated geographically with the major leagues, but such was not the case with the PCL. With no major league baseball team existing west of St. Louis, the PCL was unrivaled for American west coast baseball. Although it was never recognized as a true major league, its quality of play was considered very high. Drawing from a strong pool of talent in the area, the PCL produced many outstanding players, including such future major-league Hall of Famers as Joe DiMaggio, Ted Williams, Tony Lazzeri, Paul Waner, Earl Averill, Bobby Doerr, Joe Gordon, and Ernie Lombardi. Amid success experienced after World War II, league President Pants Rowland began to envision the PCL as a third major league. During 1945 the league voted to become a major league. However, the American League and National League were uninterested in allowing it to join their ranks.

While many PCL players went on to play in the major leagues, teams in the league were often successful enough that they could offer competitive salaries to avoid being outbid for their players' services. Some players made a career out of the minor leagues. One of the better known was Frank Shellenback, whose major league pitching career was brief, but who compiled a record PCL total of 295 wins against 178 losses. (It should be mentioned, however, that Shellenback's long career in the PCL was largely due to his use of the spitball, banned in the major leagues in 1920, not the competitive salaries offered by PCL clubs.) Many former major league players came to the PCL to finish their careers after their time in the majors had ended.

In 1952, the PCL became the only minor league in history to be given the "Open" classification, a grade above the Triple-A level. This limited the rights of major league clubs to draft players from the PCL, and was considered an act toward the circuit becoming a third major league.

=== Sudden decline ===
The shift to the Open classification came just as minor league teams from coast to coast suffered a sharp drop in attendance, primarily due to the availability of major league games on television. The hammer blow to the PCL's major league dreams came in 1958 with the arrival of the first MLB teams on the west coast (the Los Angeles Dodgers and San Francisco Giants). As a result, three of the PCL's flagship teams (the Los Angeles Angels, Hollywood Stars, and San Francisco Seals) were immediately forced to relocate to smaller markets. The Oakland Oaks had moved to Canada two years before the Giants arrived. The San Diego Padres and Seattle Rainiers suffered the same fate when they were displaced by major league teams, the new Padres and the Pilots, respectively, in 1969. Additionally, the PCL lost customers to the major league teams which then occupied the same territory. The league never recovered from these blows. The Pacific Coast League reverted to Triple-A classification in 1958, where it remained, and soon diminished in the public eye to nothing more than another minor league.

=== Moving beyond the coast ===
The PCL began to spread out across the nation, and internationally, in the 1950s. Previously, Salt Lake City had been the easternmost city in the league. In 1956, the Oakland Oaks relocated to Canada where they became the Vancouver Mounties, the circuit's first international team. Two years later, the Los Angeles Angels moved to become the Spokane Indians and the San Francisco Seals became the Phoenix Giants.

The league continued to expand throughout the country in the 1960s. Clubs representing new cities during the decade included the Dallas Rangers, Denver Bears, Eugene Emeralds, Hawaii Islanders, Indianapolis Indians, Oklahoma City 89ers, Tacoma/Phoenix Giants, and Tucson Toros. From 1964 to 1968 the PCL swelled to twelve teams. The Albuquerque Dukes and Vancouver Canadians were a few of several teams to begin play in the 1970s. Several new teams arrived in the 1980s, such as the Calgary Cannons, Colorado Springs Sky Sox, Edmonton Trappers, and Las Vegas Stars, but the league began to stabilize as franchise relocations became less frequent.

=== Further expansion ===
In 1998, the Pacific Coast League took on five teams from the disbanding American Association, which had operated in the Midwest, and a sixth franchise was added to the league as an expansion team, thus providing the scheduling convenience of an even number of teams. The addition of the Iowa Cubs, Nashville Sounds, Oklahoma RedHawks, Omaha Royals, New Orleans Zephyrs, and the expansion Memphis Redbirds grew the league to an all-time-high 16 clubs. Despite its name, the league now extended well beyond the Pacific coast, stretching from Western Washington to Middle Tennessee; half of its teams were located east of the Rocky Mountains.

The league's presence in Canada diminished and ended in the early 2000s, as the Vancouver Canadians moved to Sacramento to become the RiverCats in 2000 (however, a short-season A club replaced that one there), the Calgary Cannons moved to Albuquerque, New Mexico, to become the Albuquerque Isotopes in 2003, and the Edmonton Trappers, the circuit's final Canadian team moved to Round Rock in 2005. Of the cities represented in the PCL in its heyday, only Salt Lake City and Sacramento remain, and even these were represented by franchises different from those that originally called these cities home. In 2005, the Pacific Coast League became the first minor league ever to achieve a season attendance of over 7 million. In 2007, league attendance reached an all-time high of 7,420,095.

In 2019, the team previously known as the Colorado Springs Sky Sox relocated to San Antonio, Texas and continued play in the PCL as the San Antonio Missions, assuming the identity of a team which had previously competed in the Double-A Texas League. This move was accompanied by realignment in the American Conference. Nashville and Memphis moved to the Northern Division, and Oklahoma City and San Antonio moved to the Southern Division. After the 2019 season, the New Orleans Baby Cakes relocated to Wichita, Kansas where they became known as the Wichita Wind Surge; the Wind Surge, though, would never play a PCL game due to the cancellation of the 2020 season and Minor League Baseball's subsequent reorganization.

=== Takeover by Major League Baseball ===
The start of the 2020 season was postponed due to the COVID-19 pandemic before ultimately being cancelled on June 30. As part of Major League Baseball's 2021 reorganization of the minor leagues, the Pacific Coast League was reduced to 10 teams and temporarily renamed the "Triple-A West" for the 2021 season. In that reorganization, Memphis, Nashville, Omaha and Iowa were laterally transferred to the International League, but Wichita was demoted to the Double-A Texas League without ever playing a PCL game and San Antonio was returned to that league and level after a single season, and Fresno was demoted three full levels to the now-Low-A California League. The only team added to the PCL was the formerly-independent Sugar Land Skeeters; the other two teams to fill the Triple-A level went to the IL.

Following MLB's acquisition of the rights to the names of the historical minor leagues, the Triple-A West was renamed the Pacific Coast League effective with the 2022 season.

== Structure and season ==
The league is divided into two divisions, East and West, of five teams each. As of the 2022 season, all teams play a 150-game schedule, beginning in late March and concluding in late September.

=== Players ===
The Pacific Coast League uses a salary cap. As of the 2024 season, clubs are required to spend a maximum of US$1,610,000 on player compensation, with a minimum salary of $35,800 per player. For players aged 23 and younger on standard contracts, only 50% of their salary counts towards the cap (up to $250,000 total). There is also a separate salary cap for coaches and technical staff.

Rosters are limited to a size of 28 players on Opening Day weekend, although up to 9 players can be signed on the roster before the transactions date limit.

=== Championship and interleague play ===
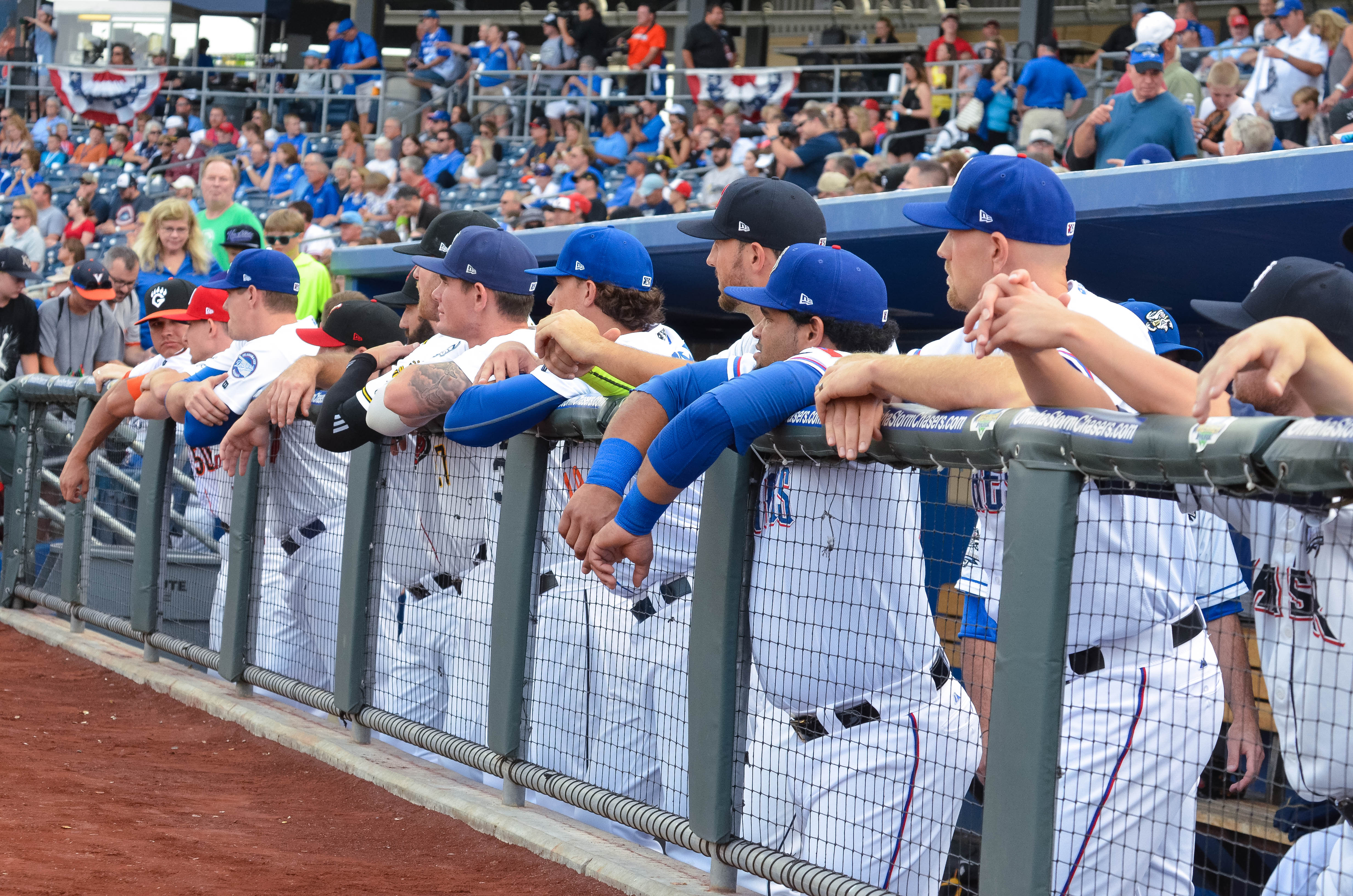
PCL All-Stars at the 2015 Triple-A All-Star Game

Beginning with the 2023 season, the regular season is split into two halves. After the completion of the season, the winners of each half meet in a best-of-three series to determine a league champion. The PCL champion then meets the International League's champion in the Triple-A National Championship Game, a single game to determine an overall champion of Triple-A baseball, which has been held annually since 2006, excluding 2020 and 2021. Previously, the PCL champion also competed in the Triple-A World Series (1983, 1998–2000), Junior World Series (1919), and other sporadic postseason competitions throughout the league's history.

Other interleague play occurred during the Triple-A All-Star Game. Traditionally, the game took place on the day after the mid-summer Major League Baseball All-Star Game. The game was meant to mark a symbolic halfway-point in the season (though not the mathematical halfway-point which, for most seasons, is usually one month prior). During the All-Star break, no regular-season games were scheduled for two days before the All-Star Game itself.

== Teams ==
Division	Team	Founded	MLB affiliation	Affiliated	City	Stadium	Capacity
East	Albuquerque Isotopes	2003	Colorado Rockies	2015	Albuquerque, New Mexico	Rio Grande Credit Union Field at Isotopes Park	13,500
East	El Paso Chihuahuas	2014	San Diego Padres	2014	El Paso, Texas	Southwest University Park	9,500
East	Oklahoma City Comets	1962	Los Angeles Dodgers	2015	Oklahoma City, Oklahoma	Chickasaw Bricktown Ballpark	9,000
East	Round Rock Express	2000	Texas Rangers	2021	Round Rock, Texas	Dell Diamond	11,631
East	Sugar Land Space Cowboys	2012	Houston Astros	2021	Sugar Land, Texas	Constellation Field	7,500
West	Las Vegas Aviators	1983	Athletics	2019	Summerlin South, Nevada	Las Vegas Ballpark	10,000
West	Reno Aces	2009	Arizona Diamondbacks	2009	Reno, Nevada	Greater Nevada Field	9,013
West	Sacramento River Cats	2000	San Francisco Giants	2015	West Sacramento, California	Sutter Health Park	14,014
West	Salt Lake Bees	1994	Los Angeles Angels	2001	South Jordan, Utah	The Ballpark at America First Square	6,500
West	Tacoma Rainiers	1960	Seattle Mariners	1995	Tacoma, Washington	Cheney Stadium	6,500

East Division, West Division

== Rules ==
The Pacific Coast League plays by the same rules listed in the Official Baseball Rules published by Major League Baseball. One exception was the use of the designated hitter (DH). Whereas the application of the DH rule in Major League Baseball was determined by the identity of the home team, with the rules of the home team's league applying to both teams, PCL pitchers hit when both clubs were National League affiliates and they agreed to have their pitchers hit. Two National League affiliated clubs were allowed to use the DH instead. The reason for this was that as players move up and get closer to reaching the majors, teams preferred to have the rules follow (as closely as possible) those of the major leagues. The DH was always used when one or both teams are American League affiliates. Since MLB's adoption of the universal DH in 2022, the DH is always used in PCL games.

Other differences lay in the use of professional baseball's pace-of-play initiatives which began to be implemented in 2015. A 15-second pitch clock is used when no runners were on base; 20 seconds are allowed with runners present. Teams are limited to five mound visits during a nine-inning game. Pitchers are required to face a minimum of three consecutive batters until the side is retired or the pitcher is injured and unable to continue playing.

== Teams timeline ==
Note: Teams in italics are PCL "classic" teams from the league's height in the 1950s.

- Los Angeles Angels (1903–1957) → Spokane Indians (1958–1971) → Albuquerque Dukes (1972–2000) → Portland Beavers (2001–2010) → Tucson Padres (2011–2013) → El Paso Chihuahuas (2014–present)
- Oakland Oaks (1903–1955) → Vancouver Mounties (1956–1962) → Dallas-Fort Worth Rangers (1963) → Dallas Rangers (1964) → Vancouver Mounties (1965–1969) → Salt Lake City Bees (1970) → Salt Lake City Angels (1971–1974) → Salt Lake City Gulls (1975–1984) → Calgary Cannons (1985–2002) → Albuquerque Isotopes (2003–present)
- Portland Beavers (1919–1972) → Spokane Indians (1973–1982) → Las Vegas Stars (1983–2000) → Las Vegas 51s (2001–2018) → Las Vegas Aviators (2019–present)
- Portland Beavers (1978–1993) → Salt Lake Buzz (1994–2000) → Salt Lake Stingers (2001–2005) → Salt Lake Bees (2006–present)
- Sacramento Senators (1903) → Tacoma Tigers (1904-1905) → Fresno Raisin Eaters (1906) (Note: The 1907–1908 Sacramento Cordovas played in the California League after returning from Fresno.) → Sacramento Sacts (1909–1913) → Sacramento/Mission Wolves (1914) → Salt Lake City Bees (1915–1925) → Hollywood Stars (1926–1935) →San Diego Padres (1936–1968) → Eugene Emeralds (1969–1973) → Sacramento Solons (1974–1976) → San Jose Missions (1977–1978) → Ogden A's (1979–1980) → Edmonton Trappers (1981–2004) → Round Rock Express (2005–present)
- San Francisco Seals (1903–1957) → Phoenix Giants (1958–1959) → Tacoma Giants (1960–1965) → Phoenix Giants (1966–1985) → Phoenix Firebirds (1986–1997) → Tucson Sidewinders (1998–2008)→ Reno Aces (2009–present)
- Vancouver Canadians (1978–1999) → Sacramento River Cats (2000–present)
- Vernon Tigers (1909–1912) → Venice Tigers (1913–1914) → Venice/Vernon Tigers (1915) → Vernon Tigers (1916–1925) → Mission Bells (1926–1927) → Mission Reds (1928–1937) → Hollywood Stars (1938–1957) → Salt Lake City Bees (1958–1965) → Tacoma Cubs (1966–1971) → Tacoma Twins (1972–1977) → Tacoma Yankees (1978) → Tacoma Tugs (1979) → Tacoma Tigers (1980–1994) → Tacoma Rainiers (1995–present)

=== Former American Association teams ===
One league team was acquired by the PCL following the disbandment of the American Association after the 1997 season.

- Oklahoma City 89ers (1963–1968) (Note: The Oklahoma City 89ers were members of the American Association in 1962 and from 1969 to 1997.) → Oklahoma RedHawks (1998–2008) → Oklahoma City RedHawks (2009–2014) → Oklahoma City Dodgers (2015–2023) → Oklahoma City Baseball Club (2024) → Oklahoma City Comets (2025–present)

=== Former Atlantic League teams ===
One league team joined the PCL from the independent Atlantic League in the 2021 reorganization.

- Sugar Land Skeeters (2021) → Sugar Land Space Cowboys (2022–present)

=== Former teams ===
Two former league teams played in the PCL from 1964 to 1968. Each one had played in the International League during the 1963 season, and each was transferred to the American Association after the 1968 season.

- Arkansas Travelers (1964–1965) → Tulsa Oilers (1966–1968)
- Indianapolis Indians (1964–1968)

Seven former league teams were transferred to other leagues in conjunction with the 2021 reorganization of the minors. Memphis, which was created as an expansion team in 1998, was transferred to the International League along with Iowa, Nashville, and Omaha, which joined the PCL from the American Association in 1998. Wichita, which also traces its roots to the American Association, was moved to the Texas League along with San Antonio. Fresno was transferred to the California League.

- Nashville Sounds (1998–2020)
- Iowa Cubs (1998–2020)
- Memphis Redbirds (1998–2020)
- Denver Bears (1963–1968) (Note: Denver/New Orleans were members of the American Association from 1969 to 1997.) → New Orleans Zephyrs (1998–2016) → New Orleans Baby Cakes (2017–2019) → Wichita Wind Surge (2020)
- Omaha Royals (1998) → Omaha Golden Spikes (1999–2001) → Omaha Royals (2002–2010) → Omaha Storm Chasers (2011–2020)
- Portland Browns (1903–1904) → Portland Giants (1905) → Portland Beavers (1906–1917) (Note: The 1917 Portland Beavers ceased operations, and its slot in the PCL was offered to Sacramento.) → Sacramento Senators (1918–1935) → Sacramento Solons (1936–1960) → Hawaii Islanders (1961–1987) → Colorado Springs Sky Sox (1988–2018) → San Antonio Missions (2019–2020)
- Seattle Siwashes (1903–1906) → Seattle Rainiers (1919–1921) (Note: The 1907–1918 Seattle club played in the Northwest League and Pacific Coast International League.) → Seattle Indians (1922–1937) → Seattle Rainiers (1938–1964) → Seattle Angels (1965–1968) → Tucson Toros (1969–1997) → Fresno Grizzlies (1998–2020)

== Presidents ==
Seventeen presidents led the PCL before its 2021 reorganization:

- 1902–1903: James Moran
- 1903–1906: Eugene F. Bert
- 1907–1909: J. Cal Ewing
- 1910–1911: Judge Thomas F. Graham
- 1912–1919: Allan T. Baum
- 1920–1923: William H. McCarthy
- 1924–1931: Harry A. Williams
- 1932–1935: Hyland H. Baggerly
- 1936–1943: W. C. Tuttle
- 1944–1954: Clarence H. Rowland
- 1955: Claire V. Goodwin
- 1956–1959: Leslie O'Connor
- 1960–1968: Dewey Soriano
- 1968–1973: William B. McKechnie Jr.
- 1974–1978: Roy Jackson
- 1979–1997: Bill Cutler
- 1998–2020: Branch B. Rickey

== Past champions ==
League champions have been determined by different means since the Pacific Coast League's formation in 1903. With few exceptions, most PCL champions through 1927 were simply the regular season pennant winners. However, a few seasons during this time did feature a postseason championship series to crown a champion. It was not until the mid-1930s that the league instituted regular postseason play that was only sporadically cancelled due to financial problems or other factors. Beginning with 2023, the regular-season is split into two halves, and the winners of each half meet in a best-of-three series for the league championship.

The San Francisco Seals won 14 PCL championships, the most among all teams in the league, followed by the Los Angeles Angels (12) and the Albuquerque Dukes and Portland Beavers (8).

== Awards ==
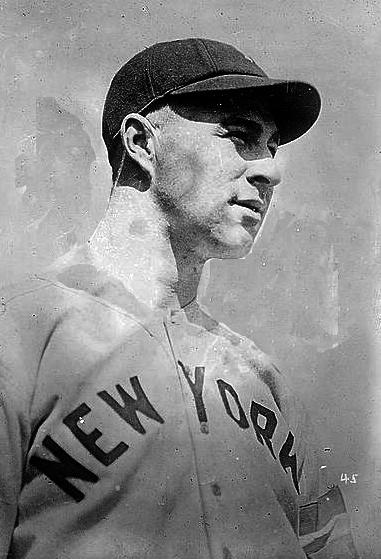
Lefty O'Doul won the first Pacific Coast League MVP Award in 1927.

The PCL recognizes outstanding players and team personnel annually near the end of each season.

=== MVP Award ===
The Most Valuable Player Award, first awarded in 1927, is given to honor the best player in the league. The award is voted on by team managers, general managers, broadcasters, and media representatives from around the league, as are all PCL year-end awards.

=== Pitcher of the Year Award ===
The Pitcher of the Year Award, awarded sporadically from 1957 to 1974 and continuously since 2001, serves to recognize the league's best pitcher. Pitchers were also eligible to win the MVP Award from 1927 to 2000.

=== Top MLB Prospect Award ===
The Top MLB Prospect Award, created in 1952 as the Rookie of the Year Award and issued from 1952 to 1972 and since 1998, is given to the best player with no prior PCL experience.

=== Manager of the Year Award ===
The Manager of the Year Award, started in 1967, is given to the league's top manager.

=== Executive of the Year Award ===
The Executive of the Year Award, first awarded in 1974, honored team executives who have achieved success in the area of attendance figures, promotions, and community involvement.

== Hall of Fame ==
The Pacific Coast League Hall of Fame was established in 1942 to honor league players, managers, and executives who have made significant contributions to the league's ideals. The Hall of Fame inducted its first class of 12 men in 1943. The Hall became dormant after 1957, but was revived in 2003, the PCL's centennial season. Today, the Hall of Fame Committee seeks to recognize worthy players throughout the league's history who have made contributions to the league. New members are elected before the start of each season.

== See also ==
- List of Pacific Coast League no-hitters
- List of Pacific Coast League records
- List of Pacific Coast League stadiums
- List of Pacific Coast League principal owners
- Sports league attendances
