= Dallas Rangers =

- 1958–1964; Dallas, Texas

Minor league affiliations
- Class: Triple-A (1959–1964); Double-A (1946–1958); Class A1 (1936–1942); Class A (1921–1935); Class B (1911–1920); Class C (1907–1910); Class D (1902–1906)
- League: Pacific Coast League (1963–1964); American Association (1959–1962); Texas League (1902–1942; 1946–1958)

Major league affiliations
- Team: Kansas City Athletics (1960; 1964); Minnesota Twins (1963); Philadelphia Phillies (1962); Los Angeles Angels (1961–1962); New York Giants (1955–1957); Cleveland Indians (1951–1952); Detroit Tigers (1946–1947); Chicago White Sox (1933, 1935–1938)

Minor league titles
- Dixie Series titles (3): 1926; 1946; 1953
- League titles (12): 1903; 1910; 1917; 1918; 1926; 1929; 1941; 1946; 1952; 1953; 1955; 1957
- First-half titles (3): 1888; 1895; 1929
- Second-half titles (3): 1888; 1903; 1932

Team data
- Name: Dallas Rangers (1958–1959; 1964); Dallas-Fort Worth Rangers (1960–1963); Dallas Eagles (1949–1957); Dallas Rebels (1939–1942; 1946–1948); Dallas Steers (1923–1938); Dallas Marines (1919–1922); Dallas Submarines (1917–1918); Dallas Giants (1902–1916); Dallas Griffins (1902)
- Previous parks: Burnett Field

The Dallas Rangers were a high-level minor league baseball team located in Dallas, Texas, from 1958 to 1964. The team was known by the Dallas Rangers name in 1958, 1959, and 1964 and as the Dallas-Fort Worth Rangers from 1960 to 1963. It played in the Double-A Texas League in 1958, the Triple-A American Association from 1959 to 1962 and the Triple-A Pacific Coast League in 1963 and 1964. Its home stadium was Burnett Field.

== Storied Texas League franchises ==
Both Dallas and Fort Worth had long and storied histories in the Texas League.

Dallas was a mainstay in the Texas League from 1902 to 1958. Over the years, it was known by many nicknames—the Griffins (1902), Giants (1903–1916), Submarines (1917–1918), Marines (1919–1922), Steers (1923–1938), Rebels (1939–1942, 1946–1948) and Eagles (1949–1957), before it was dubbed the Rangers in its final TL campaign.

The Fort Worth team was called the Panthers (1902–1935) and the Cats (1936–1942, 1946–1958, 1964).

Dallas won the Dixie Series, a postseason interleague championship between the champions of the Southern Association and the Texas League, in 1926, 1946, and 1953.

For Opening Day in 1950, the Eagles opened the season with nine retired major league stars in the field: pitcher Dizzy Dean, catcher Mickey Cochrane, first baseman Charlie Grimm, second baseman Charlie Gehringer, shortstop Travis Jackson, third baseman Home Run Baker, and an outfield of Ty Cobb, Duffy Lewis, and Tris Speaker. Dean allowed a walk to the only batter he faced, and then the Eagles team replaced the retired stars on the field. The promotion drew 54,151 fans to the Cotton Bowl, setting a Minor League Baseball record.

== Admission to Triple-A baseball ==
In 1959, the American Association expanded and admitted Dallas as an unaffiliated club and Fort Worth as an affiliate of the Chicago Cubs. Dallas' Rangers outdrew Fort Worth's Cats, 130,000 to 97,000, and the two teams were merged in 1960 as the top farm team of the Kansas City Athletics. The Dallas Cowboys, Clint Murchison's new NFL franchise, were originally to be called the "Dallas Rangers" because the baseball team's owners had told him in 1959 that they were disbanding. When the owners reversed course the following year, Murchison volunteered to rename his new team to avoid confusion.

The Rangers struggled on the field and at the gate in 1960, finishing last and drawing only 113,000 fans. In 1961, the team was affiliated with the expansion Los Angeles Angels, and then in 1962 the Angels split the working agreement with the Philadelphia Phillies. During this two-year period, the Rangers featured future MLB stars such as the Angels' Jim Fregosi and Dean Chance. But they continued to lag behind other Association members in attendance.

When the American Association itself folded after the 1962 season, the Rangers joined the Pacific Coast League and affiliated with the Minnesota Twins, inheriting the players of the defunct Vancouver Mounties. The 1963 Dallas-Fort Worth Rangers, managed by Jack McKeon and led by Triple-A rookie Tony Oliva, who hit .304 with 23 home runs, finally reached the .500 level. But the Minnesota affiliation lasted only that one season.

== Final season and relocation to Canada ==
The lowly Kansas City A's returned as the team's parent in 1964. Moreover, that season the Texas League placed a team (another Cubs' affiliate) in Fort Worth, and the Rangers reverted to their Dallas-only identity.

The last Dallas Rangers club, managed by John McNamara, won only 53 of 157 PCL games. Starting pitchers Lew Krausse Jr. and Bill Landis lost 19 and 17 games, respectively. The team drew only 39,000 fans all season. The franchise then moved in 1965 to, coincidentally, Vancouver. The Dallas-Fort Worth regional name was then applied to the Texas League club, which played in Arlington and became known as the Dallas-Fort Worth Spurs through 1971. The old nickname Rangers was revived for the major league Texas Rangers, who moved to Turnpike (renamed Arlington) Stadium in 1972.

== Yearly record ==
Year	Record	Finish Full Season	League	Attendance	Manager	Postseason
1958	76–77	Fifth	Texas League	116,085	Davey Williams; George Schepps; Fred Martin	DNQ
1959	75–87	Fourth (Western Division)	American Association	130,334	Fred Martin; Jim Fanning	DNQ
1960	64–90	Eighth	American Association	113,849	Jim Fanning	DNQ
1961	72–77	Fifth	American Association	105,933	Walker Cooper	DNQ
1962	59–90	Sixth	American Association	86,034	Dick Littlefield; Ray Murray	DNQ
1963	79–79	Third (South Division)	Pacific Coast League	118,350	Jack McKeon	DNQ
1964	53–104	Sixth (East Division)	Pacific Coast League	39,391	John McNamara	DNQ

== Notable alumni ==
- Jack Aker
- Dean Chance
- Pat Corrales
- Jim Fregosi
- Ken Harrelson
- Jim Hickman
- Rod Kanehl
- Lew Krausse Jr.
- Fred Newman
- Tony Oliva
- Howie Reed
- Buck Rodgers
- Cookie Rojas
- Lee Stange
- César Tovar
- John Wyatt
- Ray Jablonski
- Tom Burgess
- Leo Burke
- Chuck Tanner
- Mickey Harrington
- Chet Boak
- Don Larsen
- Chuck Hartenstein
- Jack Spring
- Charlie Shoemaker
- Joe Nossek
- George Banks
- Marty Martínez
- Jay Ward
- Joe McCabe
- Sandy Valdespino
- Don Kessinger
