= Abaunza =

Abaunza is a Basque surname. Notable people with the surname include:

- Bayardo Abaunza, American soccer player
- Héctor Abaunza (born 1938), Mexican fencer
- Justo Abaunza (1778–1872), Nicaraguan politician
- Lila T. Abaunza (1929–2008), First Lady of Nicaragua
- Manuel Abaunza (born 1941), American soccer player
