= Gilmore Field =

Former minor-league baseball park in Los Angeles, California

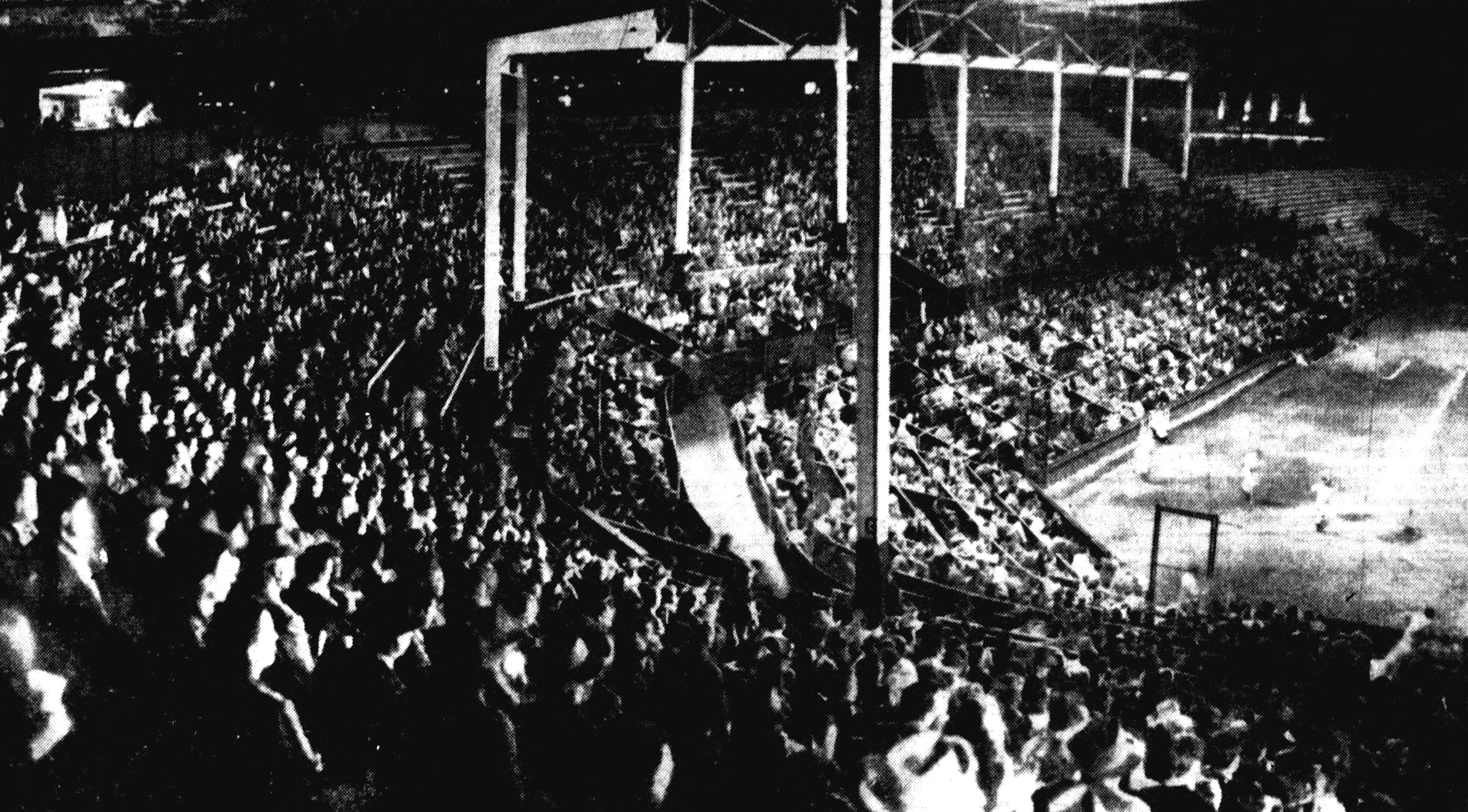
- Opening Day, 1948

- Location within the Los Angeles metropolitan area Location within California Location within the United States
- Interactive map of Gilmore Field
- Address: 7700 Beverly Boulevard; Los Angeles, California; United States
- Coordinates: 34°4′27″N 118°21′28″W
- Capacity: 12,987
- Surface: Grass
- Field size: Left Field – 335 ft. Center Left – 385; Center Field – 400 ft. Center Right – 385; Right Field − 335 ft.

Construction
- Groundbreaking: 1938
- Opened: May 2, 1939
- Closed: September 5, 1957
- Demolished: 1958

Tenants
- MLB Spring Training: Pittsburgh Pirates (NL) (1948); Minor League Baseball: Hollywood Stars (PCL) (1939–1957); Professional football: Hollywood Bears (PCPFL) (1940–1942, 1945)

Gilmore Field was a minor league baseball park in Los Angeles, California, that served as home to the Hollywood Stars of the Pacific Coast League from 1939–1957 when they, along with their intra-city rivals, the Los Angeles Angels, were displaced by the transplanted Los Angeles Dodgers of the National League.

== History ==
Gilmore Field was the home of the Hollywood Stars of the Pacific Coast League from May 2, 1939 through September 5, 1957. The stadium had a seating capacity of 12,987 people. The opening game in 1939 was an 8-5 loss to the Seattle Rainiers.

=== Location ===
The ballpark was located on the south side of Beverly Boulevard between Genesee Avenue and The Grove Drive, just east of where CBS Television City is currently located. A couple hundred meters to the west was Gilmore Stadium, an oval-shaped venue built several years earlier, which was used for football games and midget auto racing. To the east was the famous Pan-Pacific Auditorium. Both facilities were built by Earl Gilmore, son of Arthur F. Gilmore and president of A. F. Gilmore Oil, a California-based petroleum company which was developed after Arthur struck oil on the family property. The area was rich in petroleum, which was the source of the "tar" in the nearby La Brea Tar Pits. Later, the Gilmore Drive-In Theater was built, just south of the ballpark and east of the Farmers Market.

=== Field ===
The field had intimate quarters from the spectator standpoint – first and third bases were 24 feet (7.3 m) from the first row of seats. Home plate was 34 feet (10 m) from the stands. The outfield gave the pitchers more of a break with foul lines 335 feet (102 m) long, power alleys about 385 feet (117 m), and 407 feet (124 m) to center field. The power alleys were thus 40 feet (12 m) deeper than in the cross-town counterpart, Wrigley Field. The diamond was situated in the northwest corner of the field.

At the time of filming of the final scenes for The Stratton Story, the distance markers, visible in some shots, were: foul lines 335 feet (102 m), power alleys 360 feet (110 m), and the pair of center field corners either side of the batters background 400 feet (120 m).

== Baseball ==
=== Hollywood Stars ===
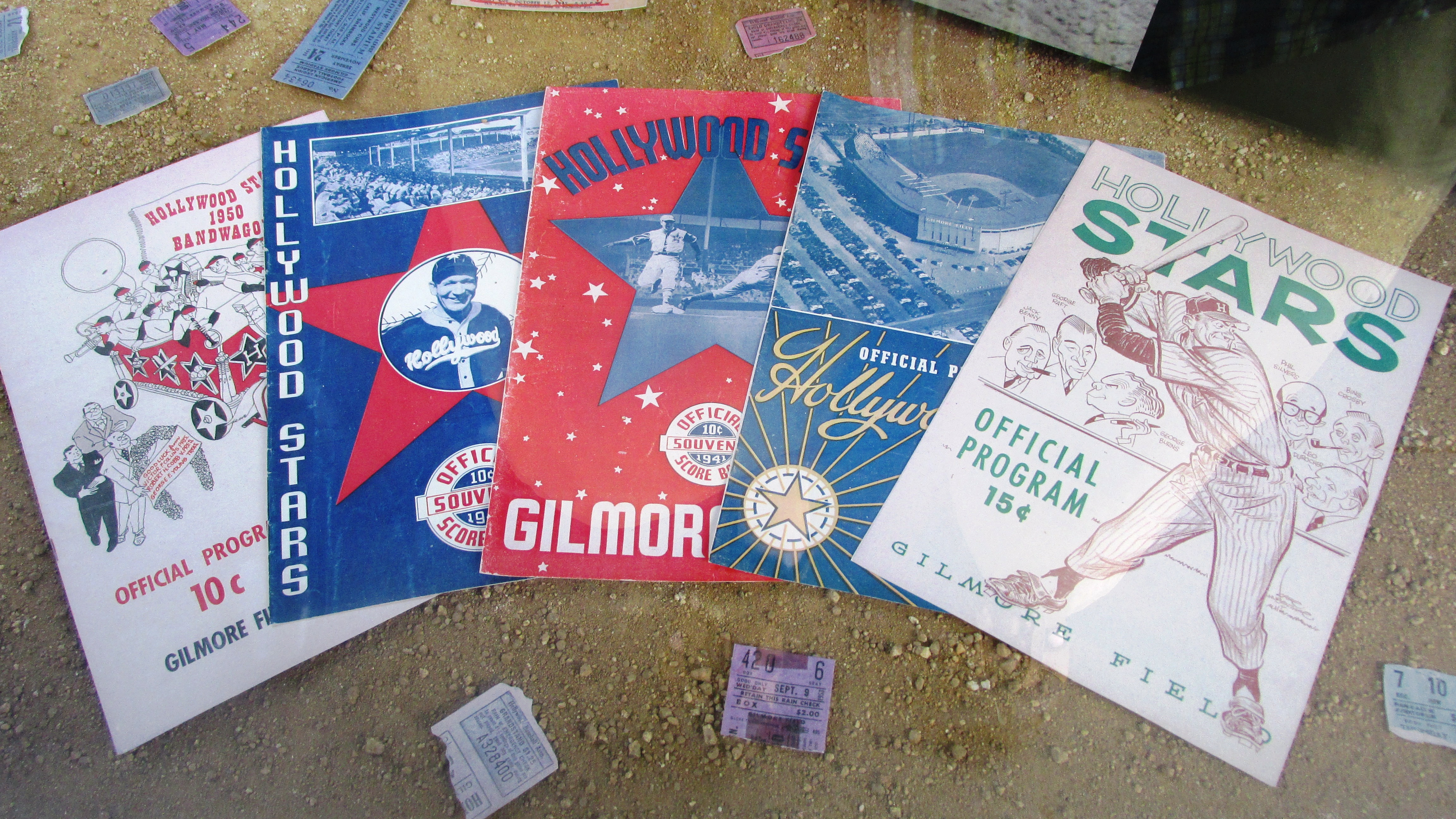
Hollywood Stars memorabilia

In 1938 Herbert Fleishhacker, owner of the Mission Reds moved his team to Los Angeles, and took the name of the Hollywood Stars after the city's previous PCL franchise. After but one season, the team was sold to new owners, among them Bob Cobb of Brown Derby Restaurant fame and the inventor of the California Cobb Salad. In their salad days, as it were, the Stars attracted glamorous actors and other celebrities or anyone else who wanted to be "seen", much as Dodger Stadium would later. One of the L.A. Angels players, Chuck Connors, made a successful move from one side of the box seat railing to the other, becoming the star in The Rifleman, a popular 1950s TV show.

The Stars would play at Gilmore Field through the 1957 season. Their final game there came on September 5, 1957, a 6–0 victory over the San Francisco Seals. Stars pitcher Laurin Pepper nearly pitched a no-hitter, giving up a single with two outs in the ninth inning.

=== Pittsburgh Pirates ===
In 1948, Gilmore Field was used as the spring training location for the Pittsburgh Pirates.

== Movies ==
Although L.A.'s Wrigley Field seemed to get the majority of Hollywood screen time, Gilmore Field also had its moments on celluloid. It was featured in a 1949 movie called The Stratton Story, starring James Stewart and June Allyson, the true story of a promising pitcher (Monty Stratton) whose career was curtailed due to a hunting accident that left him with an artificial leg. Stratton's major league baseball career was over, but he made a comeback at the minor league level. The scenes at the end of the movie were set elsewhere but were filmed at Gilmore Field. The layout of the outfield, including the exceptionally high left and right field corners, help to identify it. Also, some billboards on the outfield wall advertised Los Angeles-based businesses, such as Gilfillan Radio.

In The Atomic City (1952), Gilmore Field plays the site of a "Communist spy drop" during a game, with the still-new televising of the game providing the FBI agents with close-ups.

Gilmore Field was also seen in the movie 711 Ocean Drive (1950). Half of the neon art deco "Hollywood Stars" sign, above the stadium entrance, is clearly visible.

== Demolition ==
The ballpark site was abandoned after 1957. Gilmore Field was razed in 1958, beginning soon after an announcement in the Los Angeles Times of January 17. Much of the site is now occupied by a parking lot at CBS Television City, near the Farmers Market. In September 1997, the Pacific Coast League Historical Society, CBS, and the A.F. Gilmore Company dedicated a bronze plaque in commemoration of Gilmore Field on a wall outside CBS Studio 46. "The Ferris Wheel", one of the episodes of Rescue 8, a syndicated United States television series broadcast in September 1958, was filmed at the demolition of Gilmore Field and includes many views of the stadium as it was being razed.
