= Bayardo Abaunza =

Soccer player (born 1936)

Personal information
- Full name: Bayardo Abaunza
- Date of birth: January 30, 1936 (age 90)
- Place of birth: Granada, Nicaragua
- Position: Center-back

Senior career*
Years	Team	Apps	(Gls)
1964	Los Angeles Kickers		
1965–1967	Orange County F.C.		

International career
1965–1969	United States	3	(0)
- * Club domestic league appearances and goals

Bayardo Abaunza (born January 30, 1936) is a former soccer player who spent his career with amateur teams in the Los Angeles area. Born in Nicaragua, Abaunza represented the United States national team.

== Club career ==
Abaunza, the older brother of Manuel Abaunza, moved to Los Angeles in the late 1950s. On May 6, 1960, he scored a goal for the Los Angeles All Stars in an 8–1 defeat at the hands of visiting Munich 1860. In 1964, he played for the Los Angeles Kickers-Victoria when they won the 1964 National Challenge Cup. In 1965, he moved to Orange County F.C. of the Continental League. In 1966, Orange County lost in the final of the 1966 National Challenge Cup. He played for Orange County through at least 1967.

== National team ==
Abaunza earned three caps with the U.S. national team between 1965 and 1969. His first game with the national team came in a March 17, 1965, World Cup qualification win over Honduras. He played the second game with Honduras, a 1–1 tie four days later. Abaunza did not play again until April 20, 1969. On that day, the U.S. lost 2–0 to Haiti.
