= Gilmore Oil Company =

Oil company

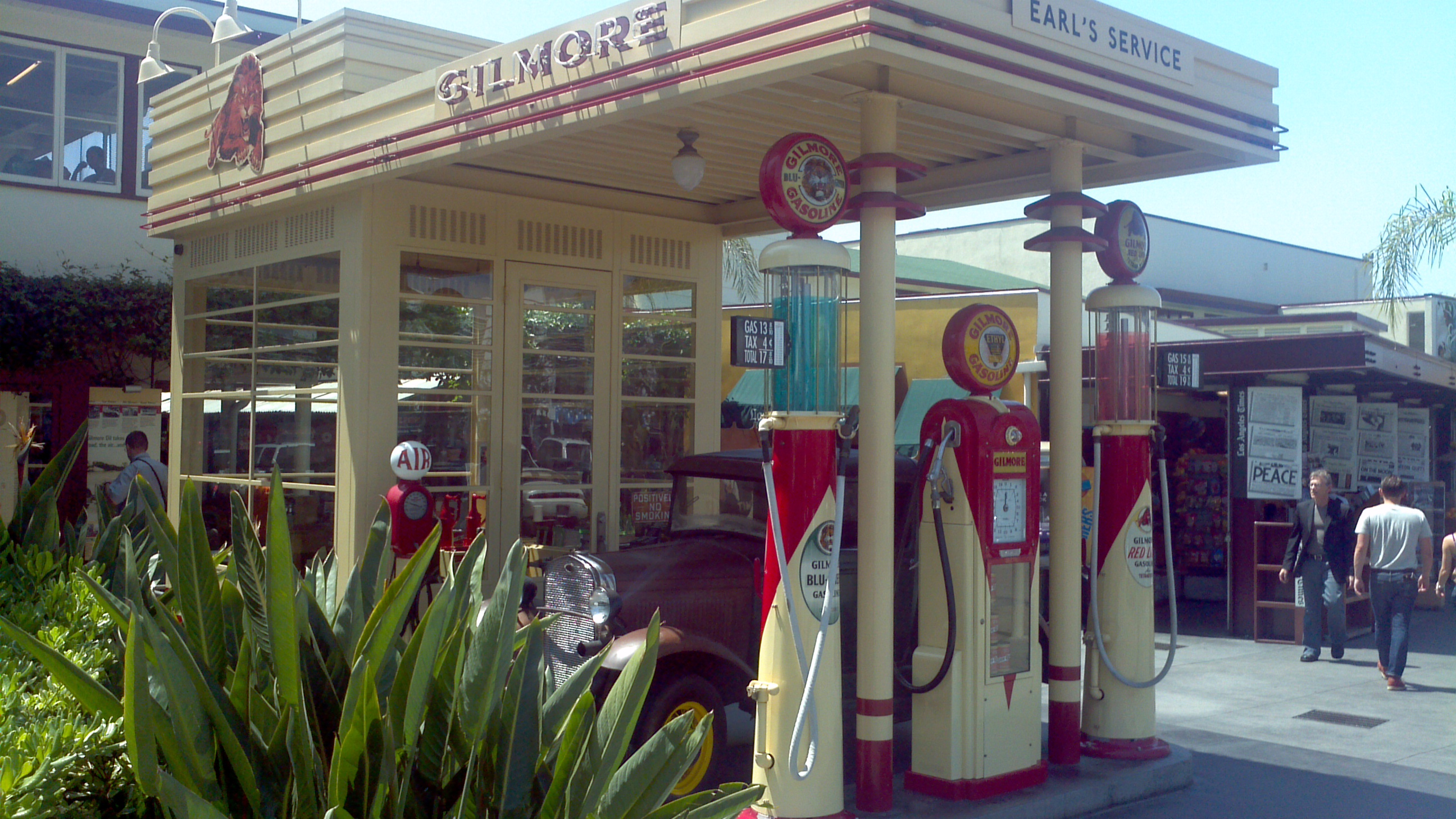
An old Gilmore filling station, preserved at the Farmer's Market

The Gilmore Oil Company was an independent oil company in California which was founded by Arthur Fremont Gilmore after he struck oil on his dairy farm in the Fairfax district of Los Angeles around 1903. His son, Earl Bell Gilmore, took over the family business and expanded its distribution network which, at its peak, operated over three thousand gas stations on the West Coast. He increased advertising and sponsorships to promote the company.

== History ==
Arthur and Earl Gilmore with the staff of Gilmore Oil around 1914. Earl is leaning against the automobile with a roof while his father stands next to him with his hand on the fender of a Model T.

Arthur Fremont Gilmore moved to California in the 1870s and, with another farmer Julius Carter, established a dairy farm in Compton. In 1880, they acquired a 256-acre (104 ha) tract of James Thompson, who had gone bankrupt, and established another dairy farm. In 1890, Gilmore's partnership with Carter was dissolved and they drew straws to divide their farms – Gilmore got the property. He lived with his family in the adobe farmhouse there and, around 1903, drilled for water so that he could expand their dairy herd. Instead of water, he struck oil. This find was part of the substantial Salt Lake Oil Field and the farm was converted to oil production. The A. F. Gilmore Oil Co. initially sold the petroleum and tar for lubrication and paving, but Gilmore saw the potential of the automobile and started refining the crude oil into gasoline.

Arthur Gilmore died in 1918 and his son, Earl Bell Gilmore, took charge. He had initially sold gasoline from a horse-drawn tanker at the corner of La Brea Avenue and Wilshire Boulevard and this became the site of the first Gilmore gasoline station. E. B. Gilmore expanded the business, establishing over three thousand more gas stations on the west coast. His methods included energetic advertising and promotion. He created the branding for Red Lion gasoline with the slogan "Roar with Gilmore" and sponsored daredevils like Roscoe Turner, who flew with Gilmore, the flying lion, and John Cobb who drove the Railton Red Lion to set a land speed record of 369.7 miles per hour (595.0 km/h).

The Gilmore property was named Gilmore Island and a variety of other businesses were established there. Gilmore Island was a county island (unincorporated Los Angeles County) for many years but was incorporated into the city of Los Angeles by 1950. The Original Farmers Market at 3rd & Fairfax was established in 1934 and this still exists today as a major attraction at "3rd and Fairfax". The Gilmore Stadium was established at the same time. This initially hosted midget car racing and then added boxing matches and the Los Angeles Bulldogs football team. Gilmore Field was opened as the home of the baseball team, the Hollywood Stars. Other attractions on Gilmore Island included specialty shops at The Dell, a drive-in theater and the Pan-Pacific Auditorium.

In the 1940s, 75% of the shares in the oil company were acquired by the Socony-Vacuum Oil Company and it was then merged into that group which became Mobil. In 2006 the A.F. Gilmore Company regained control of all of the original Gilmore art licenses.
