= 1964 National Challenge Cup =

- Dewar Challenge Cup

Tournament details
- Country: United States

Final positions
- Champions: Los Angeles Kickers (2nd title)
- Runners-up: Philadelphia Ukrainian Nationals

The 1964 National Challenge Cup was the 51st edition of the United States Soccer Football Association's annual open soccer championship, now called the U.S. Open Cup. The Los Angeles Kickers won their second title by defeating the Philadelphia Ukrainians in a replay at Wrigley Field in Los Angeles. It was a rematch of the 1960 final, which Philadelphia won 5–3.

== Final ==
June 1, 1964

Philadelphia Ukrainians (PA)	2–2 OT	Los Angeles Kickers-Victoria (CA)
Walter Chyzowych 44', 86'		Helmut Weiss; Manuel Abaunza

Cambria Field, Philadelphia, Pennsylvania
Attendance: 5,000
Referee: William Peters

June 21, 1964

Los Angeles Kickers-Victoria (CA)	2–0	Philadelphia Ukrainians (PA)
Al Zerhusen 77'; Helmut Weiss 83'

Wrigley Field, Los Angeles, California
Attendance: 3,000
Referee: Henry Landauer
