= Gilmore Stadium =

Demolished stadium in Los Angeles

Coordinates: 34°04′28″N 118°21′36″W

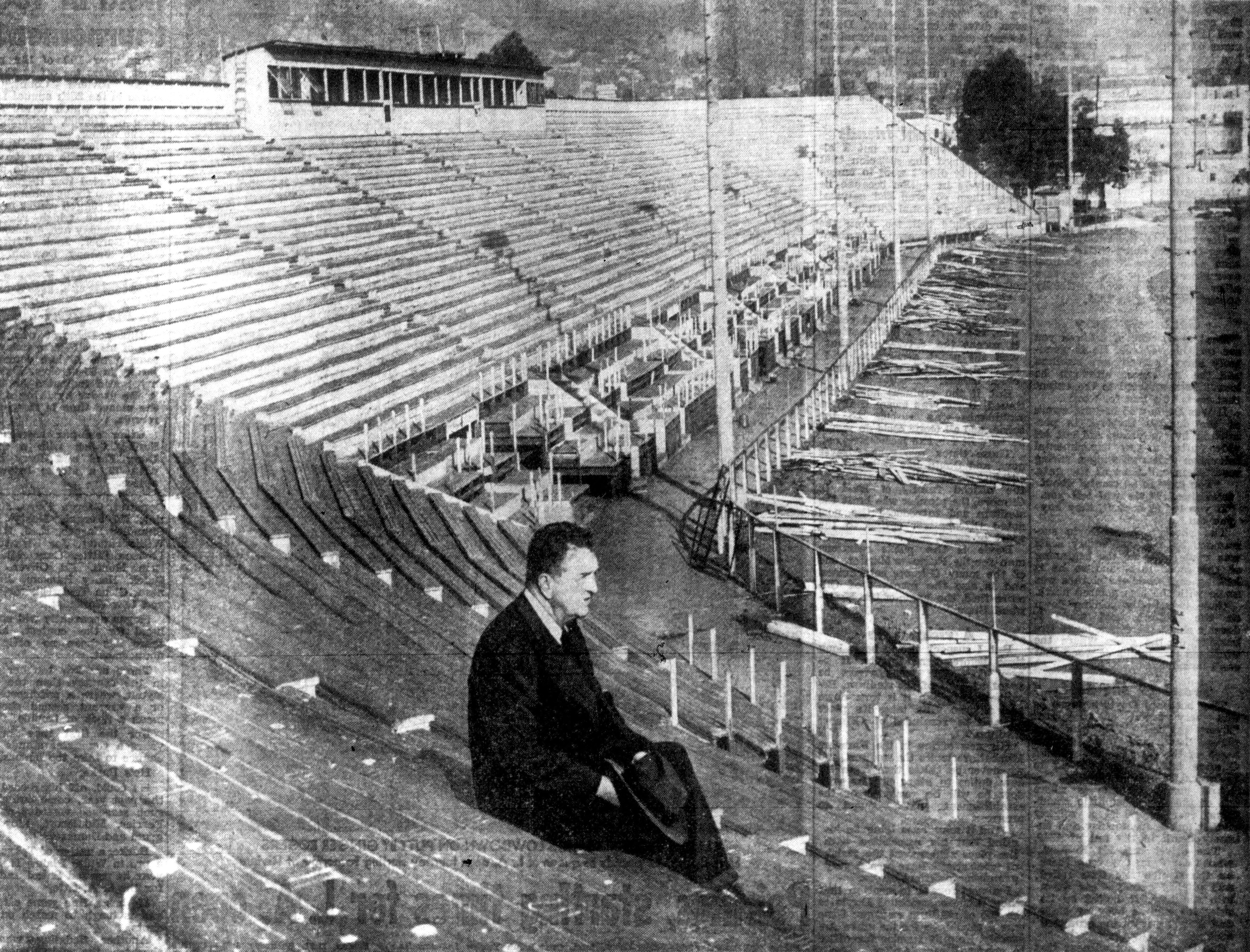
- Gene Doyle, the manager of Gilmore Stadium, sits alone in the grandstands in 1951.

- Location within the Los Angeles metropolitan area Location within California Location within the United States
- Interactive map of Gilmore Stadium
- Address: Los Angeles, California
- Capacity: 18,000

Construction
- Opened: 1934
- Demolished: 1952

Tenants
- Hollywood Stars (PCL) 1939; Los Angeles Bulldogs (PCPFL) 1940–1947; Los Angeles Mustangs (PCPFL) 1943–1944; Loyola Marymount Lions football Pepperdine Waves football

Gilmore Stadium was a multi-purpose stadium in Los Angeles, California. Built for Earl Gilmore, president of California-based Gilmore Oil Company, the stadium opened in 1934, held 18,000, and was demolished in 1952, after which the land was used to build CBS Television City.

== Uses ==
=== Opening ===
The first events staged at Gilmore Stadium were a series of shows featuring prominent Hollywood actors led by Screen Actors Guild and president Eddie Cantor; they were held on May 18–20, 1934. The event sought to raise money for less wealthy actors such as extras.

=== Football ===
Gilmore Stadium was home to the Los Angeles Bulldogs, Los Angeles's first professional football team. They played in the stadium until 1948, when they moved to Long Beach, California. Gilmore Stadium was also home to the Los Angeles Mustangs of the Pacific Coast Professional Football League, and in the early 1940s, several other teams in the league also used the stadium as their home. The stadium was also home to the Loyola Marymount Lions and Pepperdine Waves football teams.

Gilmore Stadium was the site of two 1940 National Football League Pro Bowls. The first, held on January 14, 1940, saw reigning champion Green Bay Packers defeat an All-Star team from the nine competing clubs 16–7. The second, held on December 29, 1940, saw the Chicago Bears defeat an All-Star team from the nine competing clubs 28–14. Extra seating was added to accommodate 21,000 fans for this game, which set a record for the largest professional game crowd in Los Angeles.

=== Baseball ===
The Hollywood Stars of the Pacific Coast League played in Gilmore Stadium early in the 1939 season, while awaiting completion of nearby Gilmore Field.. The infield was situated in the southwest corner of the stadium, with right field so close to home plate that baseballs hit over the right field fence were ruled ground-rule doubles.

=== Midget car racing ===
Despite the first modern-day midget car racing program taking place at Charles C. Hughes Stadium in Sacramento, California and Loyola Stadium being the first midget car racing stadium in Southern California, Gilmore Stadium is often billed as the first stadium purposely built for this style of racing. Gilmore Stadium hosted midget car racing from the track's debut in 1934 to 1950.

Notable races at the stadium during this time period include the 1939 Turkey Night Grand Prix and the race on August 10, 1950, where Rodger Ward broke Offenhauser engine's winning streak. Notable drivers at Gilmore Stadium include Bill Betteridge, Fred Friday, Walt Faulkner, Perry Grimm, Sam Hanks, Curly Mills, Danny Oakes, Roy Russing, Bob Swanson, Bill Vukovich, Rodger Ward, and Karl Young, while drivers killed at Gilmore Stadium include Ed Haddad, Swede Lindskog, Speedy Lockwood, Frankie Lyons, and Chet Mortemore.

More than five million fans attended races at Gilmore Stadium during its sixteen years of existence. In the 1930s, the stadium drew more than 18,000 fans each race; however, attendance dropped to below 9,000 by the late 1940s. This drop combined with increased demand for West Hollywood property led to the track's sale in 1950 and its destruction in 1951. Some of the stadium's grandstand was later installed at Saugus Speedway.

=== Other ===
Stadium scoreboard and Hollywood Hills in Three Little Pigskins

Gilmore Stadium hosted donkey baseball, dog shows, rodeos, and at least one cricket match, while Esther Williams performed at a diving and water ballet event. A temporary above ground pool was constructed for the event. Several professional boxing title matches were halso eld in the stadium and president Harry S. Truman delivered his "stiff upper lip" speech at the stadium.

The stadium was featured in a 1934 Three Stooges short featuring a football game and fittingly titled Three Little Pigskins. In the film, the scoreboard appears prominently in several shots, as does a billboard advertising Gilmore products. The Detroit Tigers and Chicago Cubs baseball teams were shown, despite the Stooges playing football. The real-life teams would play each other in the World Series the year after the short was released.

Gilmore Stadium was filled with people wanting to hear a speech by Progressive Party presidential candidate Henry A. Wallace on May 19, 1947. Katharine Hepburn also spoke at the event. The following year, Ronald Reagan introduced President Harry S. Truman at a campaign rally at the stadium.

Preceded by Wrigley Field	Home of the NFL All-Star Game; 1939 and 1940	Succeeded by Polo Grounds
