= Wrigley Field (Los Angeles) =

Former baseball stadium in Los Angeles, California

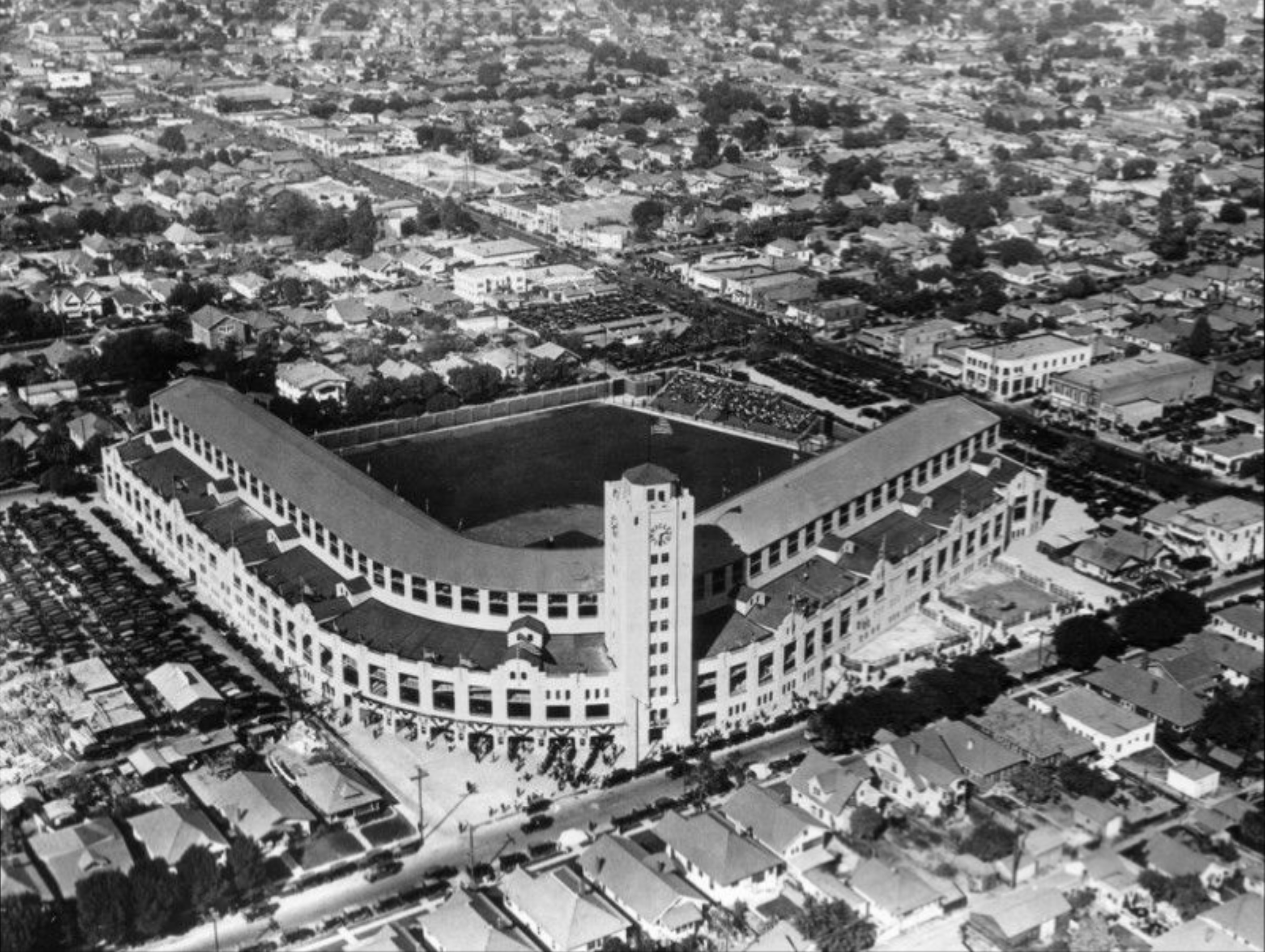
- Wrigley Field's opening in 1925

- Location in the Greater Los Angeles area Location in California Location in the United States Location in North America
- Interactive map of Wrigley Field
- Address: 425 East 42nd Place; Los Angeles, California
- Coordinates: 34°0′27″N 118°15′58″W
- Owner: William Wrigley Jr, City of Los Angeles
- Operator: City of Los Angeles
- Capacity: 22,000 (1925); 20,457 (1961)
- Surface: Natural grass; Ivy (walls)
- Field size: Left Field – 340 ft (104 m); L.C. Field – 345 ft (105 m); Center Field – 412 ft (126 m); R.C. Field – 345 ft (105 m); Right Field – 339 ft (103 m); Backstop – 56 ft (17 m)

Construction
- Groundbreaking: 1925
- Opened: September 29, 1925; 101 years ago
- Closed: 1969; 57 years ago
- Demolished: 1969
- Cost: $1.5 million
- Architect: Zachary Taylor Davis
- General contractor: A. Lanquist

Tenants
- Los Angeles Angels (PCL) (1925–1957); Hollywood Stars (PCL) (1926–1935 and 1938); Pepperdine Waves football (NCAA) (1948); Los Angeles Angels (MLB) (1961)

Wrigley Field was a ballpark in Los Angeles, California. It hosted minor league baseball teams in the region for more than 30 years. It was the home park for the Los Angeles Angels of the Pacific Coast League (PCL), as well as for the Los Angeles Angels of Major League Baseball (MLB) during their inaugural season in 1961. The park was designed by Zachary Taylor Davis, who had designed MLB stadiums Comiskey Park and Wrigley Field in Chicago, Illinois. The ballpark was used as the backdrop for Hollywood films about baseball, the 1960 TV series Home Run Derby, jazz festivals, beauty contests, and civil rights rallies.

== History ==
Called Wrigley's "Million Dollar Palace", Wrigley Field was built in South Los Angeles in 1925, and was named after William Wrigley Jr., a chewing gum magnate. Wrigley owned the first tenants, the Los Angeles Angels, a PCL team, and their parent club, the Chicago Cubs. In 1925, the Angels moved to Wrigley Field. Wrigley's Major League stadium (originally "Weeghman Park," then "Cubs Park") on the north side of Chicago was renamed Wrigley Field in 1926.

The plans to build the ballpark were announced in late 1924, with an estimated opening date of July 1, 1925. The lease on Washington Park was due to expire at the end of the season, and the Angels wanted to move on from it as soon as they could. Various delays ensued, and the ballpark was finally available for occupancy in late September.

Wrigley Field in Los Angeles was built to resemble Spanish-style architecture. It was the first of the two substantial ballparks to bear Wrigley's name. Wrigley owned Santa Catalina Island where the Cubs conducted spring training in that island's city of Avalon. (The Cubs' ball field there had also been informally known as "Wrigley Field".)

The playing field was aligned northeast (home plate to center field) at an elevation of 185 feet (55 m) above sea level. The boundary in right field (east) was a small parking lot and Avalon Boulevard (originally South Park Avenue). The other boundaries of the block were East 41st Place (north, left field - originally East 39th Street); East 42nd Place (south, first base line - originally East 41st Street); and a larger parking lot and South San Pedro Street (west, third base line - originally part of Main Street).

Lights were added to the park in 1930. Chicago's Wrigley Field added lights in 1988, when night games were added to the Cubs' home schedule.

Distance markers were posted on the outfield walls by 1936. Left field was 340 ft (104 m); left center field 345 ft (105 m); center field 412 ft (126 m); right center field 345 ft (105 m); and right field 339 ft (103 m). Following up on the decorating of Chicago's ballpark in 1938, ivy was planted on the Los Angeles ballpark walls by 1940.

== Baseball ==
=== Minor League Baseball: 1925–1957 ===
For parts of 33 seasons, late 1925 through 1957, the park was home to the Angels, who were a farm team of the Chicago Cubs. The Angels inaugurated the ballpark on September 29, 1925, with a win against the San Francisco Seals.

For 11 seasons, (1926–1935, 1938) the park was also the home of PCL team the Hollywood Stars. In 1930, the Angels and Stars combined to draw more than 850,000 fans. The Stars moved to a new ballpark, Gilmore Field, west of the Pan Pacific Auditorium. Angels players included Dodgers manager and Hall of Fame member Tommy Lasorda, Phillies, Expos, Twins and Angels manager Gene Mauch, actor Chuck Connors, Gene Baker, and Andy Pafko.

Both clubs enjoyed some successful seasons at Wrigley Field. The Angels were frequent contenders, and won the Pacific Coast League championship in 1926, 1933, 1934, 1947 and 1956. The Stars won the PCL in 1929 and 1930 during their time at Wrigley. In the 1930 playoff series, the Stars defeated their landlords, the Angels, 4 games to 1.

The parent club, Chicago Cubs, was the first major league team to play at Wrigley, when they played the Angels in a spring training game in 1926. On March 20, 1949, the major league Cubs played the defending world champion Cleveland Indians in a spring training game before 24,517 people.

On February 21, 1957, the Dodgers bought a team in Fort Worth, Texas, Wrigley Field, the Angels franchise and their territorial rights for $3 million. L.A. Wrigley's minor league baseball days ended when the Brooklyn Dodgers of the National League transferred to Los Angeles in 1958. The PCL Angels franchise relocated as the Spokane Indians to Avista Stadium in Spokane, Washington.

The final minor league games at L.A. Wrigley came on September 15, 1957, a doubleheader loss to San Diego, with the Angels finishing the season in sixth place. Some consolation for Angels fans was that their star slugger Steve Bilko won the PCL Most Valuable Player award for the third consecutive year.

The Dodgers considered using Wrigley Field, the Rose Bowl in Pasadena and the Los Angeles Coliseum. The team opted for four seasons in the 93,000-seat L.A. Coliseum, which had a 251-foot foul line in left field, while awaiting construction of Dodger Stadium, with a seating capacity of 56,000.

=== Major League Baseball: Los Angeles Angels ===
In October 1960, MLB expanded the American League from eight to 10 teams. Teams were awarded to Los Angeles and Washington, D.C. The L.A. franchise was awarded to Gene Autry and Bob Reynolds, and was called the Los Angeles Angels.

The home opener on April 27 was a 4–2 loss to the Minnesota Twins before a crowd of 11,931. In attendance were former Vice President Richard Nixon, Casey Stengel, Ford Frick, Joe Cronin, and Ty Cobb.

On October 1, 1961, the Cleveland Indians beat the Angels, 8–5, before 9,868 fans. Steve Bilko hit the last home run in Wrigley.

The 1961 Angels were reasonably successful for an expansion team, finishing in eighth place in the ten-team league. They were led in hitting by Albie Pearson with a .288 batting average, in home runs by Leon Wagner with 28, and runs batted in by Ken Hunt with 84. The pitching staff was led by Ken McBride with 12 wins. Future World Series winning manager Chuck Tanner played in seven games.

The team drew 603,510 fans, an average of about 7,500 per game. The largest crowds they pulled in, approaching the ballpark's seating capacity, were games against the Yankees.

The ballpark had always been a "hitters' park" in its minor league years, and even more so during the major league Angels' one year there. A record 248 home runs were hit, an average of three per game. That 248 figure would stand as a major league record for over 30 years, until it was broken at Denver's Mile High Stadium in the 1990s.

== Professional boxing ==
Wrigley was used frequently for boxing. Six world title boxing bouts were held there, including the 1939 Joe Louis-Jack Roper fight. Sugar Ray Robinson also boxed at Wrigley Field. Robinson won the Middleweight Championship on May 18, 1956, knocking out Carl Olson before 18,000 fans. On August 18, 1958, in a Heavyweight Championship fight, Floyd Patterson defeated Roy Harris with 17,000 in attendance.

== Football ==
=== 1938 NFL Pro Bowl ===
Several weeks after the completion of the 1938 season, the first NFL Pro Bowl was held at Wrigley Field on January 15, 1939. Sammy Baugh was among those on the rosters that matched the champion New York Giants against All-Star NFL players.

=== Pepperdine University ===
The Pepperdine Waves college football team played home games at Wrigley Field in 1948.

== Soccer ==
On May 28, 1959, the park hosted a soccer friendly match between England and the United States; England won 8–1 in front of 13,000. On June 1, 1960, Scottish Champions Hearts defeated England's Manchester United 4–0 in front of a crowd of 11,000. The U.S. Men's National Team played a World Cup qualifier against Mexico on November 6, 1960, drawing 3–3 before 9,500 people.

Wrigley Field hosted the replay of the 1964 National Challenge Cup final between the Los Angeles Kickers and Philadelphia Ukrainians. The Kickers won 2–0.

== Movies and television filming ==
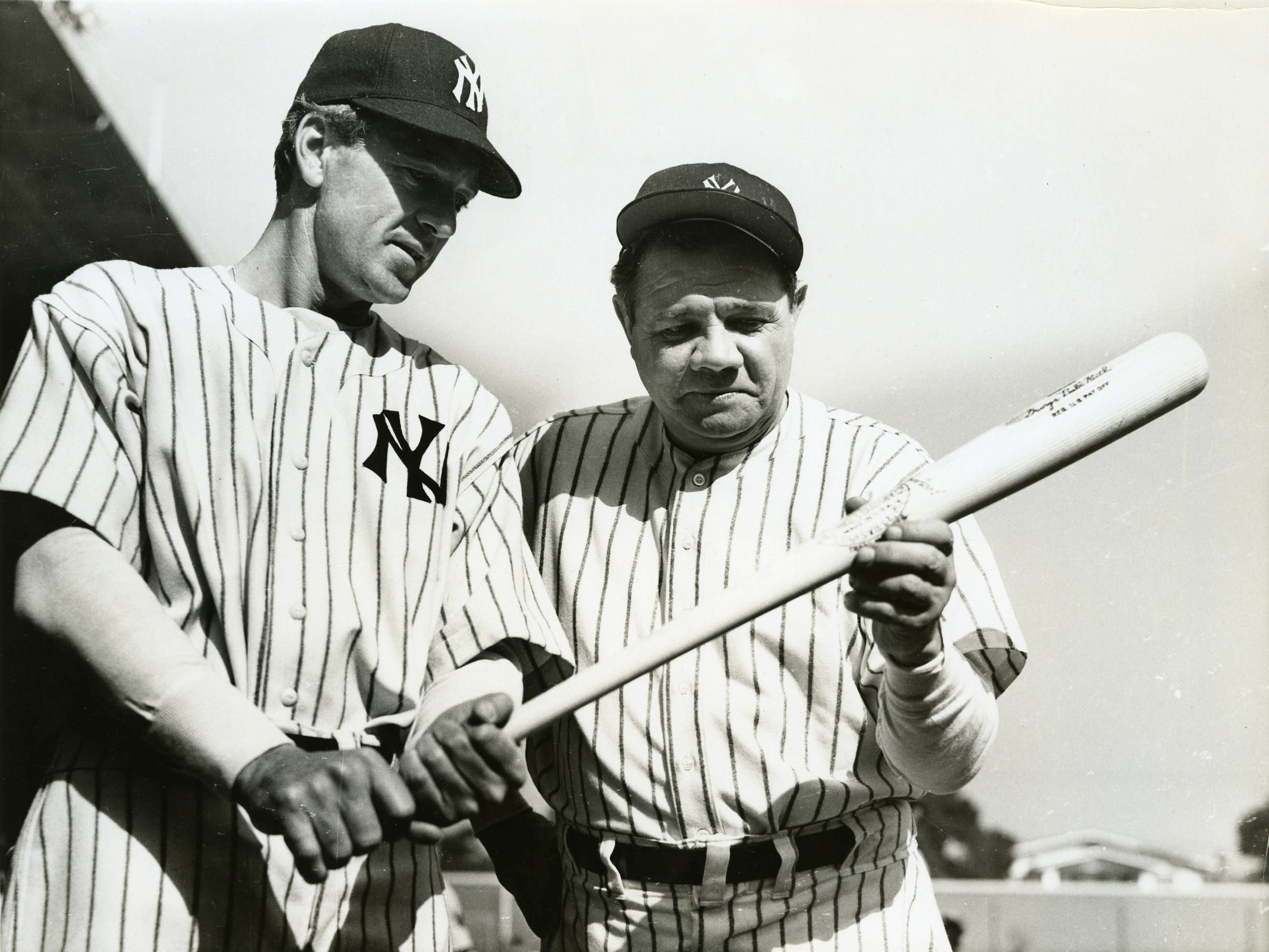
Publicity still from The Pride of the Yankees with LA Wrigley's wall and a local house in background

Being closer to Hollywood than the other large baseball fields at the dawn of motion pictures, Wrigley Field was a popular place to film baseball movies.

Some well-known movies filmed there were The Pride of the Yankees (1942) and Damn Yankees (1958). The latter provides a rare look at the ballpark in color.

The first film known to have used Wrigley as a shooting location was 1927's Babe Comes Home, a silent film starring Babe Ruth. A 1932 movie short titled Just Pals, also starring Babe Ruth, includes a scene at Wrigley in which Ruth teaches a young lad how to hit.

When Frank Capra filmed the public rally scene at Wrigley for Meet John Doe in August 1940, massive sprinklers simulated a downpour because the director included one rainy scene in each movie as good luck.

Several of the baseball action scenes in the 1949 film It Happens Every Spring were filmed there. The film noir classic Armored Car Robbery (1950) had its title heist set at Wrigley.

Some closeups were filmed there for insertion into the 1951 film Angels in the Outfield, a film otherwise set at Forbes Field in Pittsburgh.

The ballpark later found its way into television, serving as the backdrop for the Home Run Derby series in 1960, a popular show which featured one-on-one contests between baseball's top home run hitters. The series was revived in 1989 when it aired on ESPN, and later on ESPN Classic.

Overlapping the Home Run Derby production was the filming of The Twilight Zone episode, "The Mighty Casey", which aired in summer 1960.

The climactic scenes from the Mannix episode, "To Catch a Rabbit", which first aired on April 12, 1969, were filmed there, with Mannix pursuing a suspect through the ballpark's partially-demolished stands.

== Jazz concerts ==
Leon Hefflin, Sr. produced the first largest outdoor jazz entertainment event of its kind, the Cavalcade of Jazz, held at Wrigley as part of the Central Avenue jazz scene and showcased over 125 artists from 1945 to 1956. The Cavalcade of Jazz concerts were the stepping stone to success for such stars as Toni Harper, Dinah Washington, Roy Milton, Frankie Lane and others. He also hosted a beauty contest at the events. His first COJ show starred Count Basie & His Orchestra, Joe Liggins & His Honeydrippers, Valaida Snow, Big Joe Turner, the Peters Sisters, Slim & Bam (Slim Gaillard and Bam Brown), and more artists on September 23, 1945, with a crowd of 15,000.

== Demolition and legacy ==
Following the Angels' departure after the 1961 season, Wrigley Field had no regular tenants. By then the park was owned by the city, and various events were staged. On May 26, 1963, a large crowd attended a civil rights rally featuring Martin Luther King Jr. By 1966 the park was being used for soccer matches.

In October 1968, the ballpark was renamed Gilbert Lindsay Community Center as a first step in renovating the site. By the early 1970s it was being called the Gilbert Lindsay Recreation Center. Demolition was underway by January 1969. The resulting city park has a ball field in the northwest corner of the property, which was once a parking area. The diamond is locally known as "Wrigley Field", and is the home of Wrigley Little League baseball and softball. The original site of the Wrigley diamond and grandstand is occupied by the Kedren Community Mental Health Center and another parking lot.

In 1928 there had been a public debate between Wrigley and the owner of the Hollywood Stars (Bill Lane) on the subject of women being admitted free on a daily basis. Wrigley made his opinions on the subject known:

"When I built Wrigley Field, I put $1,200,000 into the plant and did so without expecting to get anything in the way of a profit on the venture. To me Wrigley Field was to be a semicivic enterprise, a gift to Los Angeles, as it were. The only thing I did want guaranteed was that ladies be admitted free to all games. That's not asking too much for a $1,200,000 investment, is it?"

The Dodgers acquired Wrigley Field and eventually donated it to the city, as part of the deal for acquiring the eventual site of Dodger Stadium. Ultimately the ballpark indeed became a civic enterprise.

== See also ==
- List of Pacific Coast League champions

== Gallery ==
Wrigley Field under construction

Wrigley Field just before opening

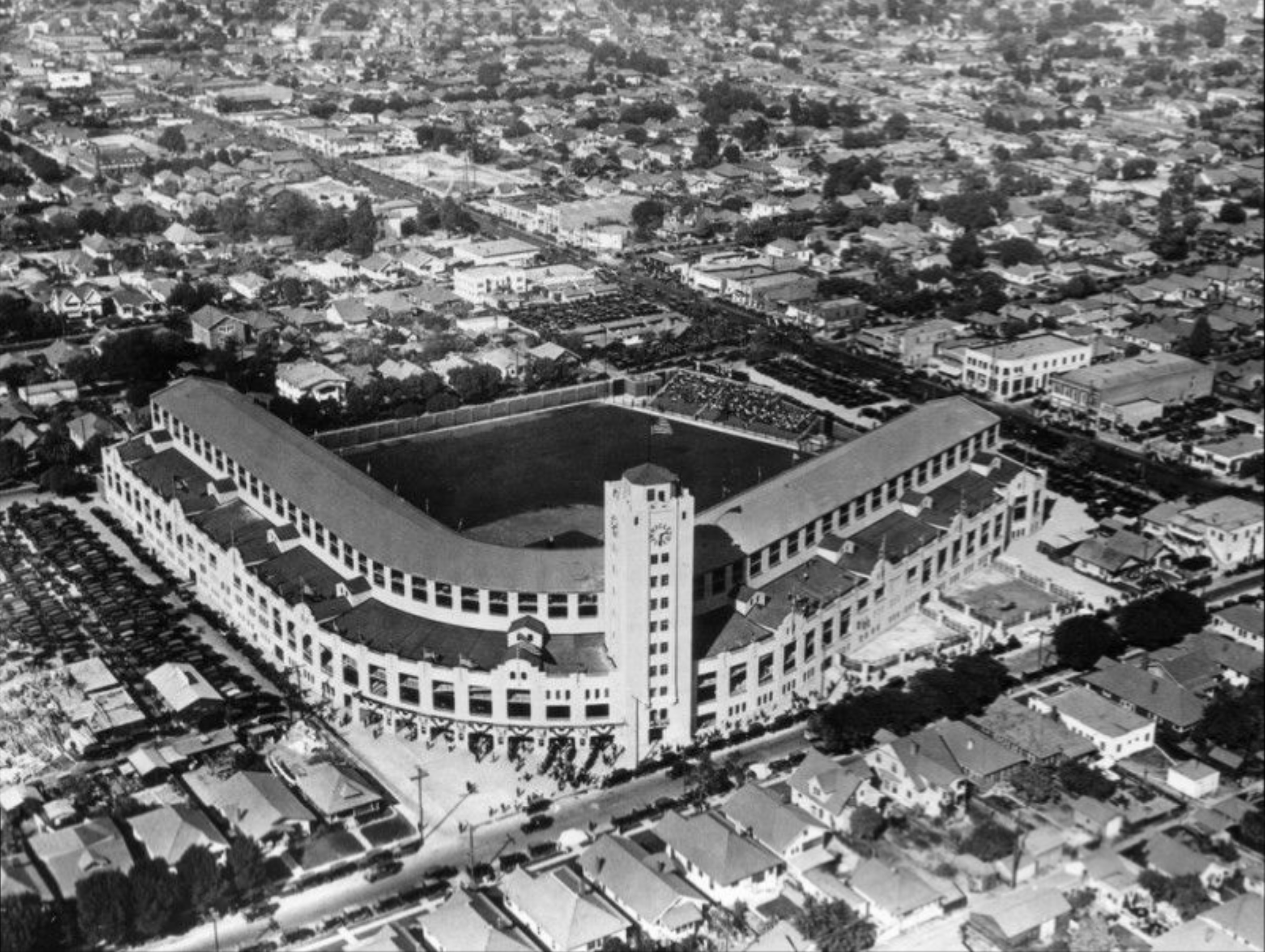
Wrigley Field on opening day, 1925

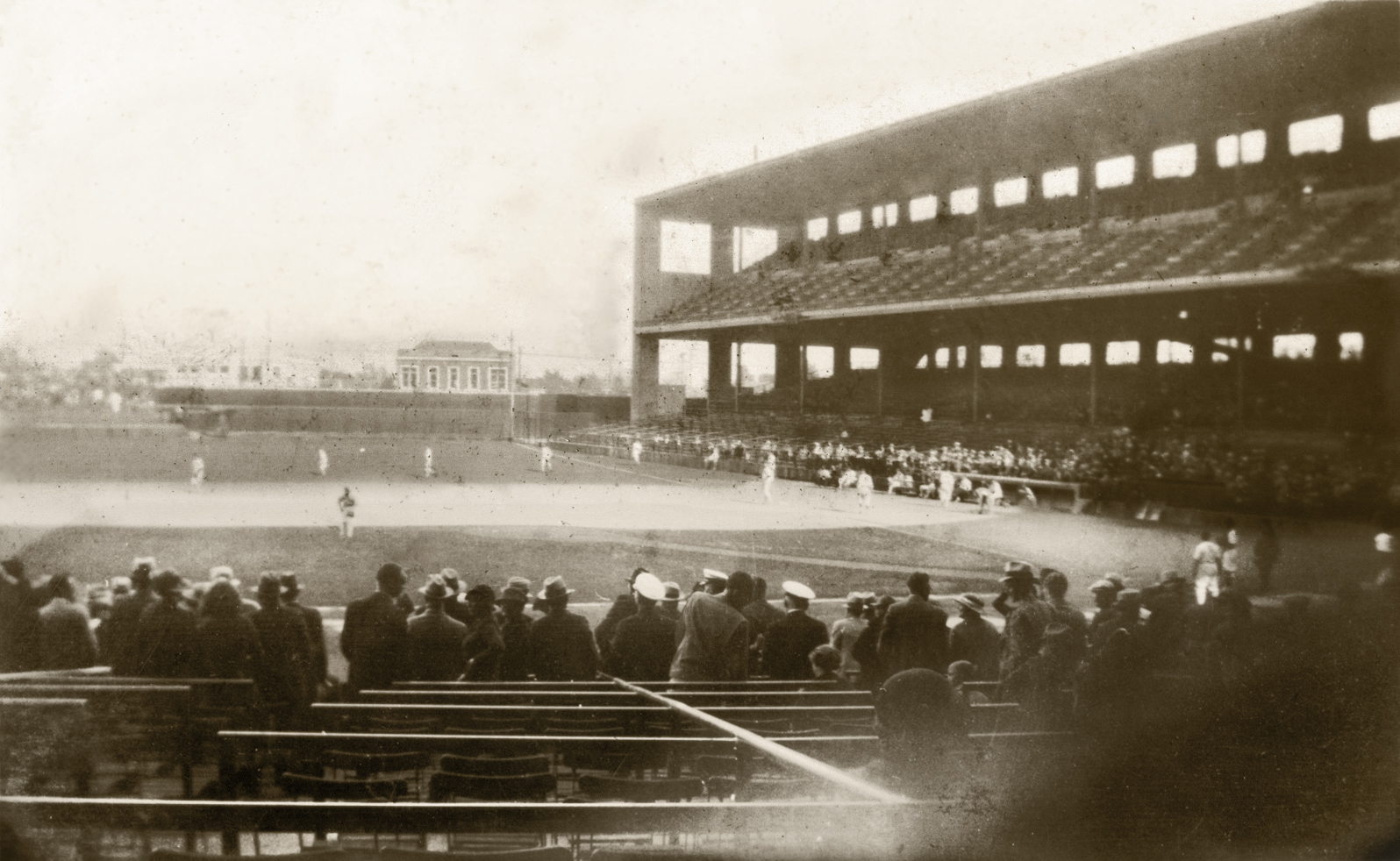
Wrigley Field in the early 1930s

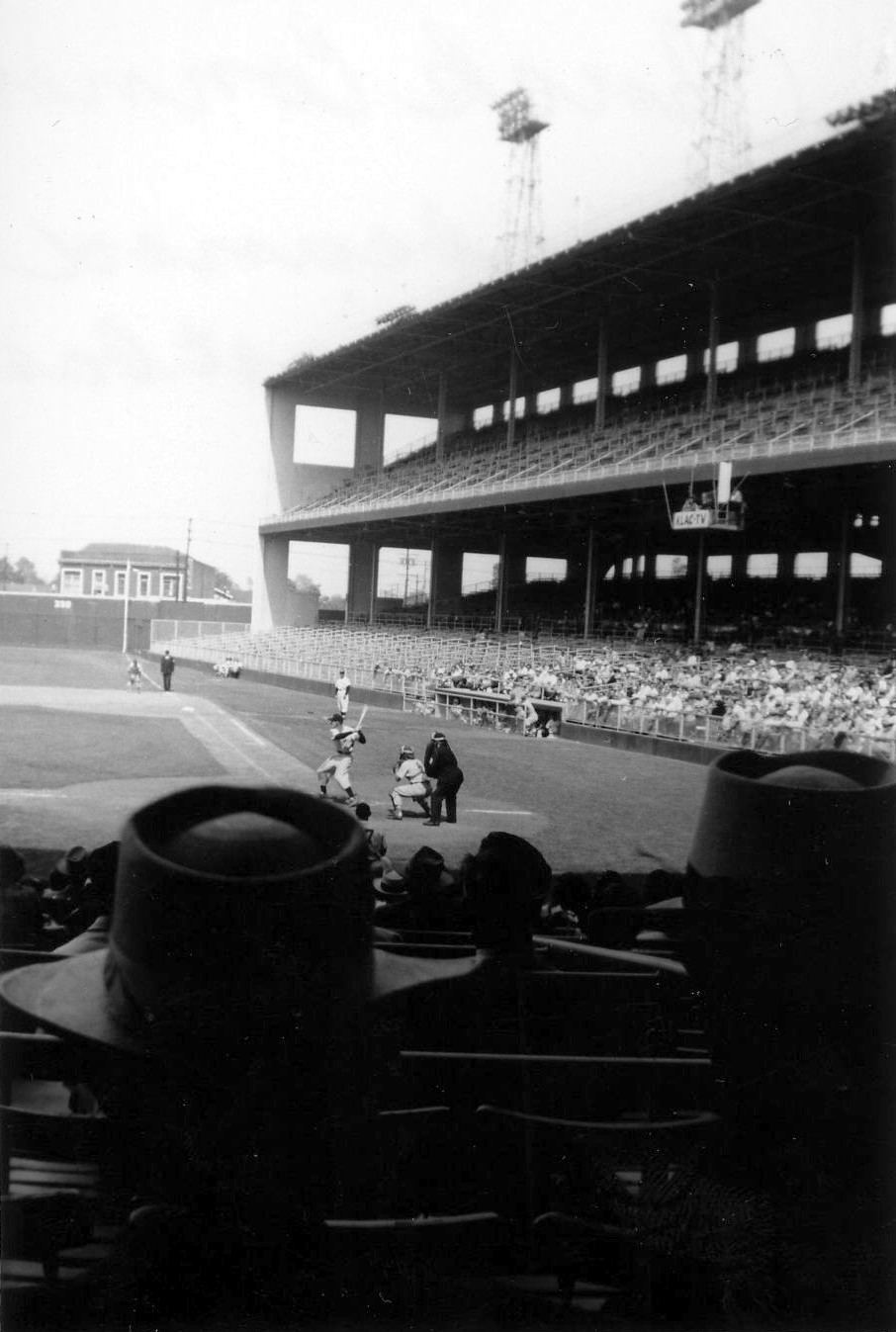
The PCL Angels at Wrigley Field, 1952

Events and tenants
Preceded by First Ballpark	Home of the Los Angeles Angels; 1961	Succeeded by Chavez Ravine Stadium
Preceded by First Stadium	Home of the NFL All-Star Game; 1938	Succeeded by Gilmore Stadium
