= Eberhard Herz =

German-American soccer player

Personal information
- Position: Forward

Senior career*
Years	Team	Apps	(Gls)
1953	TSV 1860 München		
- S.C. Eintracht
- Los Angeles Kickers

International career
	United States	1	(-)
- * Club domestic league appearances and goals

Eberhard Herz is a German-American former soccer player who played as a forward and earned one cap with the U.S. national team in a 3-3 World Cup qualification tie with Mexico on November 11, 1960.

In 1953, Herz played a half season for TSV 1860 München before immigrating to New York in 1954. There, he played for S.C. Eintracht of the German-American Soccer League, winning the 1955 National Challenge Cup over the Los Angeles Danish Americans. Herz later played for the Los Angeles Kickers, scoring in the 1960 National Challenge Cup final loss to the New York Ukrainian Nationals.
