= Manuel Abaunza =

Nicaraguan-American soccer player

Personal information
- Date of birth: 1941 (age 84–85)
- Place of birth: Nicaragua
- Height: 5 ft 7 in (1.70 m)
- Position: Inside right

Senior career*
Years	Team	Apps	(Gls)
1960	Vizcoya		
1961–1964	Los Angeles Kickers		
1965–1966	Orange County Soccer Club		
1967	Los Angeles Toros	26	(0)
1968	Los Angeles Armenians		
1969	Los Angeles Saprissa		
1969	San Pedro Olympia		
- * Club domestic league appearances and goals

Manuel Abaunza (born 1941) is a Nicaraguan-American former soccer inside right who played one season in the National Professional Soccer League.

In 1960, Abaunza, the younger brother of Bayardo Abaunza, played for Vizcoya in Costa Rica. He moved to Los Angeles in 1961 where he joined the Los Angeles Kickers, an amateur team in the Greater Los Angeles League. In 1964, the Kickers won the 1964 National Challenge Cup over the Philadelphia Ukrainians. Abaunza scored in the first game, a 2–2 tie. The Kickers then won the return leg 2–0 to take the title. In 1965, he moved to Orange County Soccer Club of the Continental League. In 1966, Orange County lost in the final of the 1966 National Challenge Cup. On January 29, 1967, Abaunza signed with the Los Angeles Toros of the National Professional Soccer League. The Toros folded at the end of the season and Abaunza moved to the Los Angeles Armenians in 1968 and Los Angeles Saprissa, a team composed almost entirely of Costa Rican players. In September 1969, he moved to San Pedro Olympia.

Although he was called into the United States men's national soccer team in the 1960s, he never played for the team in a full international.
