= Hollywood Stars =

- 1926–1957; (1926–1935, 1938–1957); Hollywood, California
Team logo
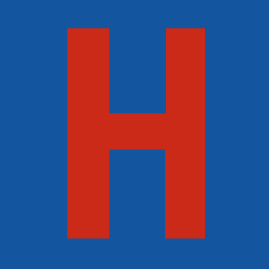
Cap insignia

Minor league affiliations
- Previous classes: Open (1952–1957); Triple-A (1946–1951); Double-A (1926–1935, 1938–1945)
- League: Pacific Coast League (1926–1935, 1938–1957)

Major league affiliations
- Previous teams: Brooklyn Dodgers (1949–1950); Chicago White Sox (1947–1948); Pittsburgh Pirates (1945–1946, 1951-1952, 1954-1957); New York Giants (1941)

Minor league titles
- League titles: 1929, 1930, 1949

Team data
- Previous names: Hollywood Stars (1926–1935, 1938–1957)
- Previous parks: Gilmore Field (1939–1957); Wrigley Field (1926–1935, 1938)

The Hollywood Stars were a Minor League Baseball team that played in the Pacific Coast League during the early- and mid-20th century. They were the arch-rivals of the other Los Angeles–based PCL team, the Los Angeles Angels.

== Hollywood Stars (1926–1935) ==
The first incarnation of the Hollywood Stars began its existence in 1903 as the Sacramento Solons, a charter member of the Pacific Coast League. The team moved to Tacoma, Washington, in 1904, where it won the pennant as the Tacoma Tigers. During the 1905 season, the team returned to Sacramento to finish out the season, moved to Fresno in 1906 to finish last as the Fresno Raisin Eaters, then left the PCL altogether. The Sacramento Solons rejoined the PCL in 1909, then moved to San Francisco during the 1914 season, finishing out the season as the San Francisco Missions. The team was sold to Utah businessman Bill "Hardpan" Lane and moved to Salt Lake City for the 1915 season. They played as the Salt Lake City Bees for the next 11 seasons until Lane moved the team to Los Angeles for the 1926 season. Originally they were known as the Hollywood Bees, but soon changed their name to the Hollywood Stars.

The original Stars, though supposedly representing Hollywood, actually played their home games as tenants of the Los Angeles Angels at Wrigley Field in South Los Angeles. Though the Stars won pennants in 1929 and 1930, they never developed much of a fan base, playing their home games miles from the glamorous Hollywood district. They were merely a team to watch when the Angels were on the road. Attendance had been quite good (by standards of that era) during their inaugural year in 1926, but tapered off after that, exacerbated by the Great Depression.

When, after the 1935 season, the Angels doubled the Stars' rent, Lane announced the Stars would move to San Diego for the 1936 season, to become the San Diego Padres. Los Angeles became a one-team city once more for the 1936 and 1937 seasons.

== Hollywood Stars (1938–1957) ==
The second incarnation of the Hollywood Stars joined the Pacific Coast League in 1909 as the Vernon Tigers. As the Tigers, the team won two PCL pennants (and finished first in another only to lose the postseason series) before moving to San Francisco for the 1926 season. The transplanted Tigers, now known as the Mission Reds or usually just "the Missions", foundered in San Francisco, failing to establish a rivalry with the existing San Francisco Seals.

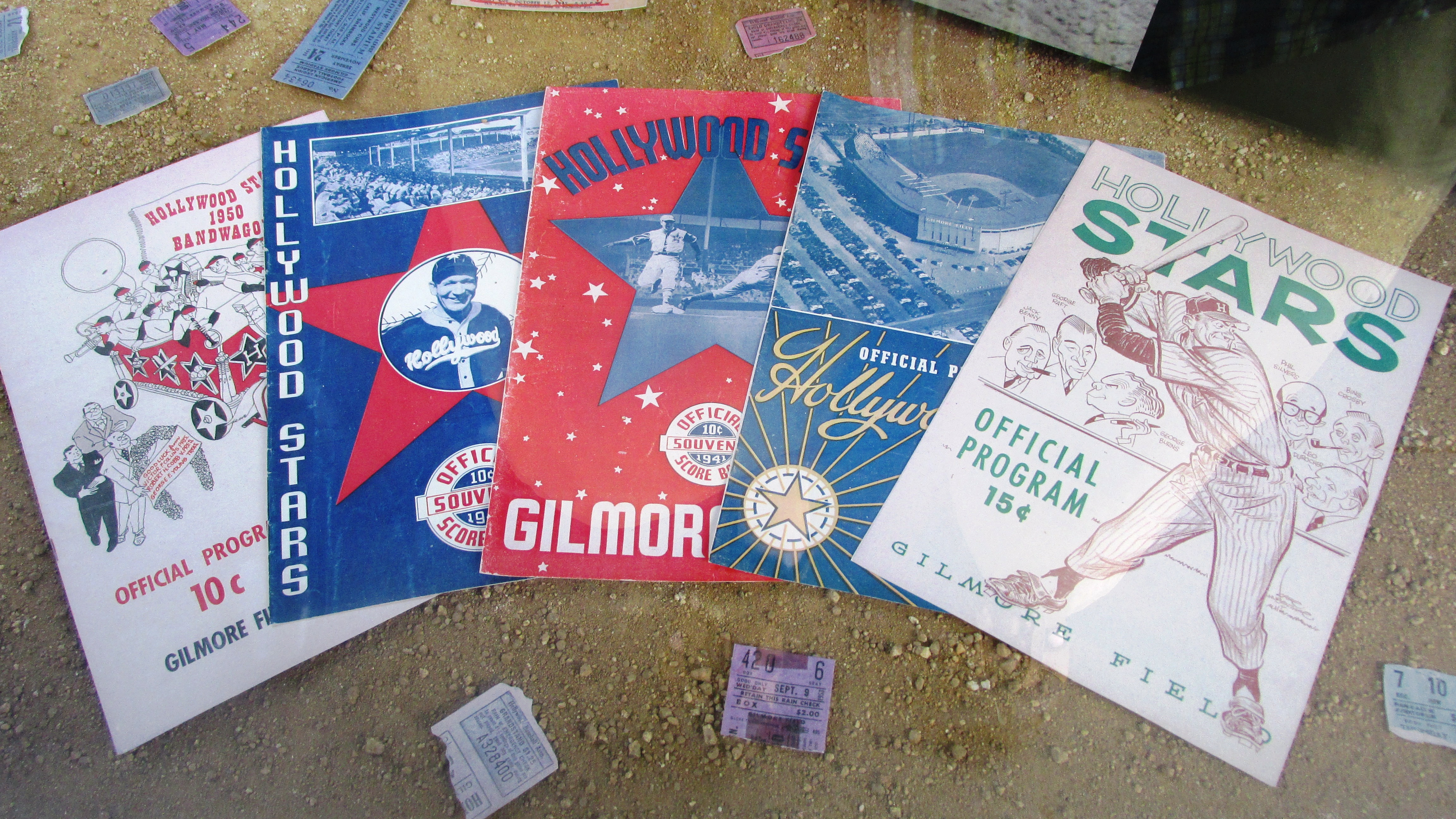
Hollywood Stars memorabilia

In 1938, Missions owner Herbert Fleishhacker moved his team back to Los Angeles, and took the name of the departed Hollywood Stars. After one season the team was sold. In early December 1938 the team was purchased by attorney Victor Ford Collins and Robert H. Cobb, owner of the Brown Derby restaurants. They formed the Hollywood Baseball association and enlisted the financial support and enthusiasm of many stars and community leaders. Celebrities who were stockholders and part-owners of the team included Lloyd Bacon, Gary Cooper, William Powell, Barbara Stanwyck, Robert Taylor, George Raft, Charles Rogers, Raoul Walsh, Roscoe Karns, William LeBaron, Gene Autry (who later became owner of his own major league franchise), George Burns and Gracie Allen, Bing Crosby, Cecil B. DeMille, William Frawley, Gail Patrick (then married to Bob Cobb) and Harry Warner. "No one was permitted to invest any big money", wrote the Los Angeles Times, which described the Hollywood Stars as "a civic thing ... plainly and simply, a Chamber of Commerce activity on the part of a group of people who want their little corner of the world to be better than all other corners."

The club was promoted as "the Hollywood Stars baseball team, owned by the Hollywood stars".

Moreover, the team actually played in the Hollywood area. In January 1939 it was announced that plans were under way to create a $200,000 ballpark seating 12,500 by May 1939. Gilmore Field was opened in the Fairfax District adjacent to Hollywood. (The club played part of the 1939 season in nearby Gilmore Stadium, after having played at Wrigley Field during 1938.)

Nicknamed the Twinks by the press, the new Hollywood Stars caught on and became a very popular team, winning three pennants before 1958. They had successful affiliations with the Brooklyn Dodgers and Pittsburgh Pirates of Major League Baseball. In 1955, actress Jayne Mansfield was named Miss Hollywood Star. The Stars became genuine rivals of the Angels, and it was not uncommon for fights between the teams to break out during Angels-Stars games. In fact, on August 2, 1953, a brawl between the two teams lasted 30 minutes, broken up only when 50 riot police were sent to Gilmore Field by Chief of Police William Parker, who was at home watching the game on television when the fight started.

The Columbia Broadcasting System, owner of Gilmore Field, announced plans to raze the facility to build out what would become its new West Coast nucleus of CBS Television City in 1952. In October 1957, the Brooklyn Dodgers confirmed their long-rumored move to Los Angeles for the 1958 season, which forced the Stars and the Angels to relocate. The Angels, who had been purchased by Dodgers owner Walter O'Malley prior to the 1957 season, became the Spokane Indians in 1958.

Having no interest in operating the Twinks anywhere but in Los Angeles, the ownership group led by Frank J. Kanne, Jr., was compelled to sell the team, which it did, to a group based in Salt Lake City. The Stars, in a sense, "returned" to Salt Lake City (from which the original Stars had moved in 1926) in 1958, becoming the Salt Lake City Bees once more.

=== Innovations ===
Pioneers in broadcasting, the Hollywood Stars televised a home game in 1939 as an experiment, and became the first team to regularly broadcast home games in the late 1940s. In the summer of 1951, Gail Patrick hosted Home Plate, a post-game interview show at Gilmore Field that immediately followed KTTV broadcasts of the Hollywood Stars home games. Patrick was assisted by sportswriter Braven Dyer. Mark Scott, who later became nationally known as the host of Home Run Derby, was the team's last play-by-play announcer.

The Twinks began the custom of dragging the infield during the fifth inning, creating an artificial break in the action hoping fans would run to the concessions stands.

The Stars adopted the use of batting helmets in 1949, at the mandate of Branch Rickey, who wanted to popularize the product as a safety precaution and a personal business venture.

=== Notable players ===
Notable players for the Hollywood Stars include pitcher Rinaldo Ardizoia who, at the time of his death on July 19, 2015, was the oldest living former member of the New York Yankees. He moved to Los Angeles with the Mission Reds, and eventually joined the Hollywood Stars' starting rotation before being drafted by the Yankees in 1940. His large store of memorabilia included a rabbit's foot given to him by Gail Patrick.

Several notable Major League Baseball players started with the Hollywood Stars, among them Gus Bell, Bobby Bragan, Bobby Doerr, Gene Freese, Babe Herman, Dale Long, Bill Mazeroski, Bob Meusel, Lefty O'Doul, Mel Queen, Dick Stuart, Lee Walls and Gus Zernial. The team's managers included Bragan, Jimmy Dykes, Fred Haney and Charlie Root.

== Affiliations ==
The Stars were affiliated with the following major league teams:

Year	Affiliation(s)
1941	New York Giants
1945–46; 1951–52; 1954–57	Pittsburgh Pirates
1947–48	Chicago White Sox
1949–50	Brooklyn Dodgers

== Cultural references ==
Cover of Double Play! (1957)

The Hollywood Stars were immortalized on the 1957 jazz album, Double Play! by André Previn and Russ Freeman. The baseball-themed album, with song titles like "Called On Account of Rain", "Batter Up", "Who's on First" and "In the Cellar Blues", features a topless model on the cover wearing a Hollywood Stars cap.

The Stars were also mentioned on episode 24 of the fourth season of I Love Lucy.

The Hollywood Stars are mentioned by Officer Ramirez in episode 212: The Big Lift of the radio program Dragnet.

The 1952 movie "The Atomic City" shows off Gilmore Field as the scene of a Russian atomic secrets drop—taking place while FBI agents try to track it over the television monitors of a televised Hollywood Stars game.
