= Art Passarella =

American baseball umpire (1909–1981)

- Born: Arthur Matthew Passarella; December 23, 1909; Rochester, New York, U.S.
- Died: October 12, 1981 (aged 71); Hemet, California, U.S.
- Years active: 1941–1942, 1945–1952
- Employer: American League
- Known for: Umpiring, Acting

Arthur Matthew Passarella (December 23, 1909 – October 12, 1981) was an American umpire in Major League Baseball, and later an actor. He worked in the American League from 1941 to 1942, and again from 1945 to 1953. He missed two years due to military service in World War II. Passarella umpired 1,668 major league games in his career. He umpired in three World Series (1945, 1949 and 1952) and two All-Star Games (1947 and 1951). He appeared in several television shows, including The Streets of San Francisco, Home Run Derby, Ironside, and Sea Hunt, and in the movie That Touch of Mink.

== Umpiring career ==
Passarella's professional umpiring career began in the 1930s with the Cotton States League. After that league dissolved, Passarella moved on to the Texas League. He umpired there for eight years before signing on to the American League.

Passarella joined the American League in 1941, then missed the 1943 and 1944 seasons due to service in the United States Army during World War II, in which he served as a plans and training clerk for a medical training battalion during the war, receiving a promotion from private first class to technician fifth grade. Passarella ran what is thought to be the first military umpire training school, conducted for members of his medical unit. In January 1945, Passarella received an honorable discharge. Holding seniority over newer umpires in the American League, he regained his umpiring job, which he held until his resignation in 1953.

In Game 5 of the 1952 World Series, Passarella called Johnny Sain out on a play at first base. Photos of the play showed Sain had beaten the throw and first baseman Gil Hodges had taken his foot off the bag before the ball arrived. Passarella was widely condemned for missing the call, and was only partially supported by commissioner Ford Frick.

Passarella was the home plate umpire for the Philadelphia Athletics no-hitter thrown by Bill McCahan on September 3, 1947.

== Acting ==
After leaving baseball, Passarella appeared in a few films, mostly as an umpire (such as in Damn Yankees and That Touch of Mink), but found more work on television, playing minor roles in Home Run Derby, Ironside, and Sea Hunt. He also made numerous uncredited appearances in the 1960s gangster series The Untouchables, usually as a hood or henchman of Frank Nitti (played by Bruce Gordon) or other Chicago hoods.

Passarella portrayed Sergeant Sekulovich in The Streets of San Francisco. Sekulovich was a "legman" for Detective Mike Stone, played by Karl Malden; the character name was an in-joke, as Sekulovich was Malden's real last name.

== Death ==
Passarella died as the result of a massive heart attack in Hemet, California in 1981. He was 71 years old.
