= Werner Mata =

American soccer player

Warner Mata is an American former soccer midfielder who earned seven caps with the U.S. national team between 1969 and 1973. He is listed as Walner Mata in some sources.

== National team ==
Mata's first two caps came in losses to Haiti in April and May 1969. His last game was a 4–0 loss to Poland on March 20, 1973.

== Club career ==
In the mid-1960s, Mata played for Orange County Soccer Club. He scored a goal in both a 1966 National Challenge Cup quarterfinal and semifinal games as Orange County went to the championship game. He then moved to the Los Angeles Kickers in the fall of 1966.
