= 1960 National Challenge Cup =

- Dewar Challenge Cup

Tournament details
- Country: United States

Final positions
- Champions: Philadelphia Ukrainian Nationals (1st title)
- Runners-up: Los Angeles Kickers

The 1960 National Challenge Cup was the 47th edition of the USSFA's annual open soccer championship. The Philadelphia Ukrainians defeated the Los Angeles Kickers to win.

== Final ==
May 29, 1960
2:15 PM EST

Philadelphia Ukrainians (PA)	5–3 OT	Los Angeles Kickers (CA)
Mike Noha 20', 45', 78' (pen.), 130', 136'	report 1 report 2	15' Al Zerhusen (pen.) Werner Staake; 50' Eberhard Herz

Edison Field, Philadelphia, Pennsylvania
Attendance: 5,500
Referee: Nels Dahlquist
