= 1958 National Challenge Cup =

- Dewar Challenge Cup

Tournament details
- Country: United States
- Dates: 3 March – 8 June 1958

Final positions
- Champions: Los Angeles Kickers (1st title)
- Runners-up: Baltimore Pompei
- Semifinalists: Ukrainian Lions; Pittsburgh Beadling

The 1958 National Challenge Cup was the 45th edition of the United States Soccer Football Association's annual open soccer championship.

== Bracket ==
=== East ===
March 3 - April 27
PA	Pittsburgh Beadling	1
MI	Ukrainian SC	0
MD	Baltimore Pompei	4-5
NY	S.C. Eintracht	2-6

May 4 - May 18
PA	Pittsburgh Beadling	2-1
MD	Baltimore Pompei	1-3

=== West ===
March 23 - April 6
CA	Los Angeles Kickers	5-8
CA	Teutonis SC	0-2
IL	Ukrainian Lions	3-1
MO	St. Louis Kutis	3-0

April 20
CA	Los Angeles Kickers	3
IL	Ukrainian Lions	0

== Final ==
June 8, 1958
2:30 PM EST

Baltimore Pompei (Maryland)	1–2 (OT)	Los Angeles Kickers (California)
16' Jo Jo Defonso	report 1 report 2	8', 110' Willie Carson

Kirk Avenue Stadium, Baltimore, Maryland
Attendance: 4,500
Referee: (USA)
