= Mark Scott (actor) =

American actor and broadcaster (1915–1960)

- Scott hosting Home Run Derby
- Born: Samuel Marks Solomon; February 21, 1915; Chicago, Illinois, U.S.
- Died: July 13, 1960 (aged 45); Burbank, California, U.S.
- Education: University of Illinois
- Occupations: Actor, TV presenter, sportscaster
- Known for: Host of Home Run Derby
- Spouse: Dorothy Scott
- Children: 3

Mark Scott (born Samuel Marks Solomon; February 21, 1915 – July 13, 1960) was an American actor and broadcaster. He is best known for hosting the Home Run Derby television show that originally aired in 1960.

== Biography ==
Scott was a native of Chicago and a graduate of the University of Illinois. As an actor, he had minor roles in television series such as Dragnet and Boston Blackie and in movies such as Hell's Horizon and -30-. He was an announcer in 1956 for the Cincinnati Redlegs of Major League Baseball and in 1957 for the Hollywood Stars of the Pacific Coast League, which transferred out of the city after that season due to the arrival of the Los Angeles Dodgers.

As host of the Home Run Derby show in 1960, Scott both announced the action and interviewed each batter while the batter's opponent was hitting. His most well known line from the show was, "It's a home run or nothing here on Home Run Derby." He died of a heart attack in Burbank, California, shortly after the first season of the show aired. Rather than find a replacement for him, the producers decided to cancel the series. Scott was also developing a celebrity golf show with the working title of Back Nine at the time of his death. He was survived by his wife and three children.
