= Gilmore (lion) =

Mascot

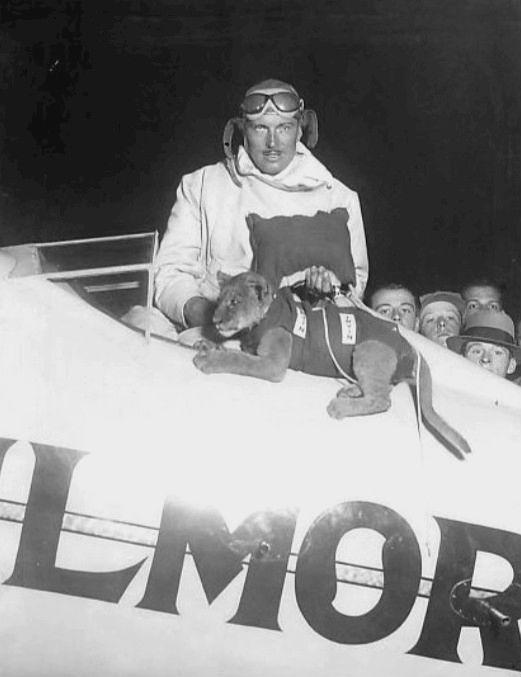
Roscoe Turner, and Gilmore as a cub (1930)

Gilmore (1930–1950) was a lion who flew with aviator Colonel Roscoe Turner to promote the Gilmore Oil Company. After he grew too large for flying, Gilmore accompanied Turner in publicity appearances for the next ten years.

Gilmore was born on February 7, 1930, at Goebel's Wild Animal Farm – a theme park and supplier of animals for Hollywood movies. The lion was sponsored by and named after the Gilmore Oil Company, whose icon was a red lion with the slogan "Roar with Gilmore". The company gave Turner $15,000 to buy the lion and a plane that was decorated to advertise Gilmore Oil. The Humane Society petitioned Turner to equip Gilmore with a parachute, which also resulted in enhancing the image of a "flying lion". After he grew too large for flying, Gilmore accompanied Turner to publicity appearances over the next ten years. During a brief eight-month period, Gilmore logged over 25,000 miles in the air and was a passenger during multiple air speed record runs. When not flying, Gilmore made public appearances including at the golf course and disconcerted the mailman and other visitors to Turner's home when he answered the door.

Once he reached 150 pounds (68 kg) in weight and had outgrown the cockpit and his parachute, he was kept at the airport in Burbank, California (then known as the United Airport), and a Gilmore Oil service station in Beverly Hills until around 1940. He spent his last decade at the World Jungle Compound, where Turner continued to pay for his food and visited him, and died on December 17, 1950. Turner then had him mounted as a display to be kept in his home. After Roscoe Turner's death in 1970, both the plane used during the 1930 campaign and Gilmore's stuffed remains were exhibited at the Turner Museum until it closed in 1972. They were then donated by his wife to the Smithsonian Institution where they were exhibited first at the Arts and Industries Building and then at the National Air and Space Museum until 1981.
