= Santa Ana Stadium =

Stadium in California

- Eddie West Field, The Santa Ana Bowl
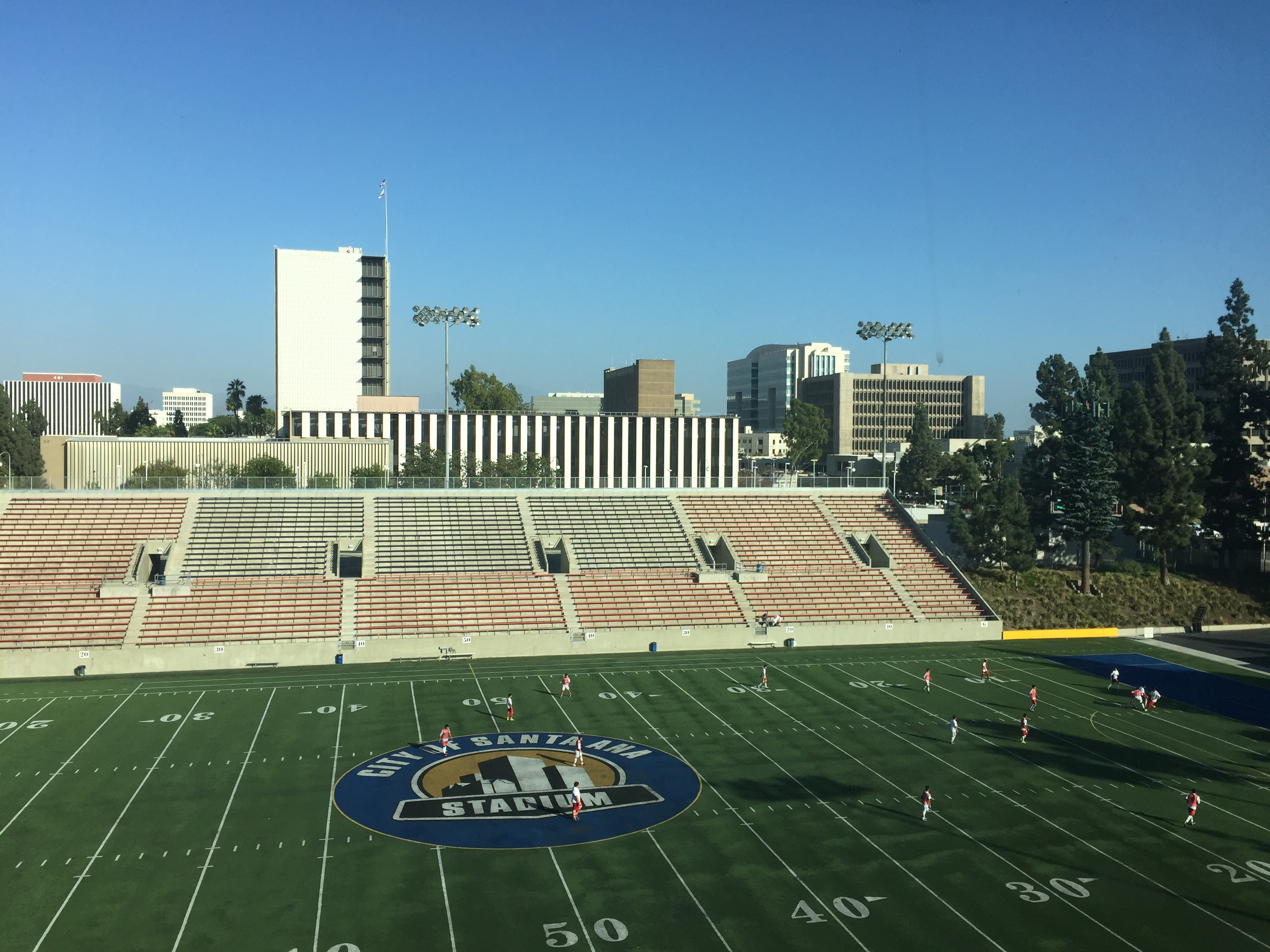
- Interactive map of Santa Ana Stadium
- Location: 602 N. Flower St. Santa Ana, California, United States, 92703
- Coordinates: 33.7506°N 117.8775°W
- Owner: City of Santa Ana
- Operator: City of Santa Ana Parks and Recreation
- Capacity: 9,000
- Public transit: Orange County Transit Authority; Bus Route 51; Bus Route 145; Bus Route 462; OC Streetcar. (Scheduled for 2020).

Tenants
- Santa Ana Unified School District; Santa Ana College; Mater Dei High School; United Premier Soccer League (US Open Cup, exhibition matches); Cal State Fullerton Titans football (NCAA) (1971–1975, 1984–1991); Los Angeles Rough Riders, MLR (1978); Santa Ana Winds FC (NPSL/UPSL) (2011–present)

Santa Ana Stadium, also known as Eddie West Field or the Santa Ana Bowl, is a city-owned and operated 9,000-capacity American football and soccer stadium located in downtown Santa Ana. The field was named after Eddie West, a writer for the Orange County Register and tireless supporter of the Santa Ana College Dons and all Orange County sports.

The city's stadium holds many events in addition to its high school and college football main draws, including children's and adult soccer games through local leagues, high school and college commencement ceremonies and more. The stadium was retrofitted by the City of Santa Ana in 2016.

Current tenants include the Santa Ana Unified School District's High School football teams, the Santa Ana College Dons football team, and the Mater Dei Monarchs football team. The upstart United Premier Soccer League, founded in Santa Ana, also holds occasional exhibition and league playoff matches at the stadium, for its various clubs.

== Notable events ==
Santa Ana College held its centennial commencement at the stadium on the June 5, 2015.

Santa Ana Stadium was the site of an international soccer match between the Orange County Soccer Club and the German side Bayern Munich, one of the most popular sports clubs with an estimated 87 million fans worldwide, on June 10, 1966, in which the clubs played to a 3–3 tie. The Orange County Soccer Club played in a league called the Continental League. That same year, in 1966, the Orange County Soccer Club played the final of the national tournament, the U.S. Open Cup (then called the National Challenge Cup), and played it again in 1967, but was unable to become champion on both occasions.

The stadium was used for motorcycle speedway from 1977 to 1980. It was a significant venue and hosted important events, including the American final of the Speedway World Championship on 29 December 1977.

On Friday, January 13, 1989 Club América of the Mexican Primera División, now Liga MX, defeated FC Bayern Munich of the German Bundesliga at Santa Ana Stadium in front of 11,500 in attendance.

In March 2011, Santa Ana Winds FC, formerly of the National Premier Soccer League and later a founding member of the United Premier Soccer League, played an exhibition, at Santa Ana Stadium against a Club Atlas youth squad. In December 2011, Winds FC played another exhibition at the stadium, this time against a Chivas De Guadalajara youth squad. In 2014, Orange County Blues FC of the United Soccer League played an international exhibition game at Santa Ana Stadium against Atlético Marte of El Salvador.

== Tenants ==
=== Regular ===
- SAUSD High School football
- Mater Dei High School football

=== Occasional ===
- Santa Ana Winds FC (Have played occasional exhibition, non-regular season games at Santa Ana Stadium).
- United Premier Soccer League (Scheduled local exhibitions and U.S. Open Cup matches for its various teams in the past).
- Orange County Blues FC (Played an international exhibition game at Santa Ana Stadium against Atlético Marte of El Salvador on November 16, 2014).

=== Former ===
- Cal State Fullerton Titans football (NCAA)
- California Sunshine (American Soccer League)
- Chivas USA Academy (U.S. Soccer Development Academy)
- Los Angeles Rough Riders, Major League Rodeo (1978)
- Orange County Blue Star (Premier Development League)
- Orange County Soccer Club ("Continental League")
- Orange County Zodiac (A-League)

== History ==
Santa Ana Stadium was built in 1963 by the R.E. Gallegos Construction Company.

=== International Soccer Record ===
10 June 1966	Bayern Munich (Germany)	3–3	(United States) Orange County	Santa Ana, California
				Stadium: Santa Ana Stadium

24 April 1988	Guadalajara (Mexico)	5–4	United States	Santa Ana, California
				Stadium: Santa Ana Stadium

28 August 1988	Herediano (Costa Rica)	1–0	(Honduras) Olimpia	Santa Ana, California
				Stadium: Santa Ana Stadium

13 January 1989	América (Mexico)	2–1	(Germany) Bayern Munich	Santa Ana, California
				Stadium: Santa Ana Stadium

5 January 1993	América (Mexico)	1–0	(Costa Rica) Alajuelense	Santa Ana, California
	Sánchez 67'			Stadium: Santa Ana Stadium; Attendance: 8,000; Referee: Majid Bay (TRI)

16 November 2015	Atlético Marte (El Salvador)	2–4	(United States) Orange County	Santa Ana, California
				Stadium: Santa Ana Stadium

Santa Ana Stadium has held U.S. Open Cup matches in the past and is scheduled to hold another on November 22, 2015, pending results.

=== U.S. Open Cup Record ===
May 15, 2012	Ventura County Fusion (PDL)	6–2 (a.e.t.)	Fullerton Rangers (NPSL)	Santa Ana, CA
7:00 PMPDT	Roman; F. López; Chongo; Rupert; R. López	Report	Arvizu; Roldan	Stadium: Santa Ana Stadium; Referee: Daniel Radford

September 17, 2016; First qualifying round	Ozzy's Laguna (UPSL)	2-1	OC Crew SC (UPSL)	Santa Ana, CA
8:00 PMPDT	2		1	Stadium: Santa Ana Stadium

On October 25, 2015, UPSL team "Ozzy's Laguna FC," which formed the PDL side "LA Laguna FC," lost a US Open Cup qualifying match against So Cal Premier League side Real Sociedad in penalty kicks at East Los Angeles College thus losing the opportunity to host a US Open Cup match at Santa Ana Stadium.

=== Boxing ===
Former pro boxer Oscar De la Hoya and his Golden Boy Promotions presented a boxing card at Santa Ana Stadium on September 18, 2003, which was shown on HBO.

=== Former proposed uses ===
==== MLS ====
Santa Ana Stadium was a site twice identified as an option for a Major League Soccer franchise. Talks for a possible franchise began as far back as 2007, as then MLS investor Antonio Cue went to a State of the City Address to talk of possibly relocating Chivas USA from the Home Depot Center in Carson to the Santa Ana Stadium site. Plans included relocating the Chivas USA Academy to Santa Ana as well. In 2011, the City of Santa Ana passed a Memorandum of Understanding to enter into a six-month negotiating window with MLS via Chivas USA, (MLS and its teams are a single entity) but MLS never committed to negotiating with Santa Ana for two main reasons. One was Major League Soccer's stance (through investor Antonio Cue) that the City of Santa Ana had to pay to remodel Santa Ana Stadium. The other reason was due to MLS's long insistence on getting a stadium built for their second LA area franchise at the site of the Los Angeles Memorial Sports Arena at Exposition Park in Los Angeles. The Chivas USA Academy (U-16 and U-18) did play a season at Santa Ana Stadium then left the stadium to settle in Bell Gardens. In 2013, Sueño MLS Winner and Chivas USA player Jorge Villafaña, who grew up playing soccer in Santa Ana, started a branch of the Chivas USA Academy that played at Santa Ana Stadium until the demise of the first team.

Soon after the demise of Chivas USA, Major League Soccer investors in the Chivas USA replacement Los Angeles Football Club franchise identified a number of locations in Greater Los Angeles for a possible home for their "LAFC." Santa Ana was again counted among the possible locations for an MLS franchise. A Santa Ana fan group sprouted on social media to attract LAFC to the Santa Ana Stadium site, given its proximity to downtown amenities minutes away on foot, but Major League Soccer through investors involved with LAFC, and with the help of park operator USC, opted on building at Exposition Park in Los Angeles, a site that was identified for years by MLS as a top priority.

==== NASL ====
Santa Ana Stadium qualifies as a Division 2 stadium under the United States Soccer Federation's current divisional criteria. As such, the stadium was again identified and proposed for housing a professional soccer team, this time by grassroots efforts. Because the stadium has double the size of the USSF division 2 standard of 5000 seats, it was considered ideal for an investment at the Division 2 level. There were proposals to bring back Los Angeles Aztecs and the California Surf, (formerly owned by Henry Segerstrom, developer of South Coast Plaza), this time to Santa Ana Stadium. The original California Surf played at Anaheim Stadium for the duration of their short existence. In 2014, NASL Commissioner Bill Peterson stated the following regarding NASL expansion, "We’ve had conversations throughout California, including San Francisco, Los Angeles, Orange County, San Diego and others."

===== Sting and Joe Sumner =====
On December 11, 2015, Northern California soccer writer Evan Ream stated. "[I] can confirm that the singer Sting is in fact involved with the Orange County bid." On January 21, 2016, writer Dave Martinez of Empire of Soccer quoted NASL Commissioner Bill Peterson concerning west coast expansion as saying, "We will start making announcements as early as four weeks or as long as eight weeks … At least one market … could be more.” The rumor that Gordon Summer, aka "Sting," was involved with an NASL club in Orange County turned out false. It was not him, but his son Joe Sumner that was involved but backed out of talks to start a club in the county. Joe Sumner went on to launch a club called City of Angels FC that played one season in the National Premier Soccer League.

===== Peter Wilt & Club 9 Sports =====
In November 2016, consultant Peter Wilt of Club 9 Sports studied the possibility of launching an NASL expansion club at Santa Ana Stadium. Wilt and club executive Michael Collins visited Santa Ana Stadium and met with City of Santa Ana City Manager Gerardo Mouet and Councilman Vince Sarmiento to propose use of Santa Ana Stadium, and to determine the costs of upgrading the stadium's seats, lighting, locker rooms and the expansion of the playing field. The NASL Orange County group eventually opted on playing at Cal State Fullerton's Titan Stadium, however, within a year's time the NASL lost Division 2 sanctioning and teams to defection, causing the expansion groups to look for another league to play in. The NASL Orange County group eventually branded itself as California United FC and announced its players would play in the United Premier Soccer League in 2018.

== Gallery ==
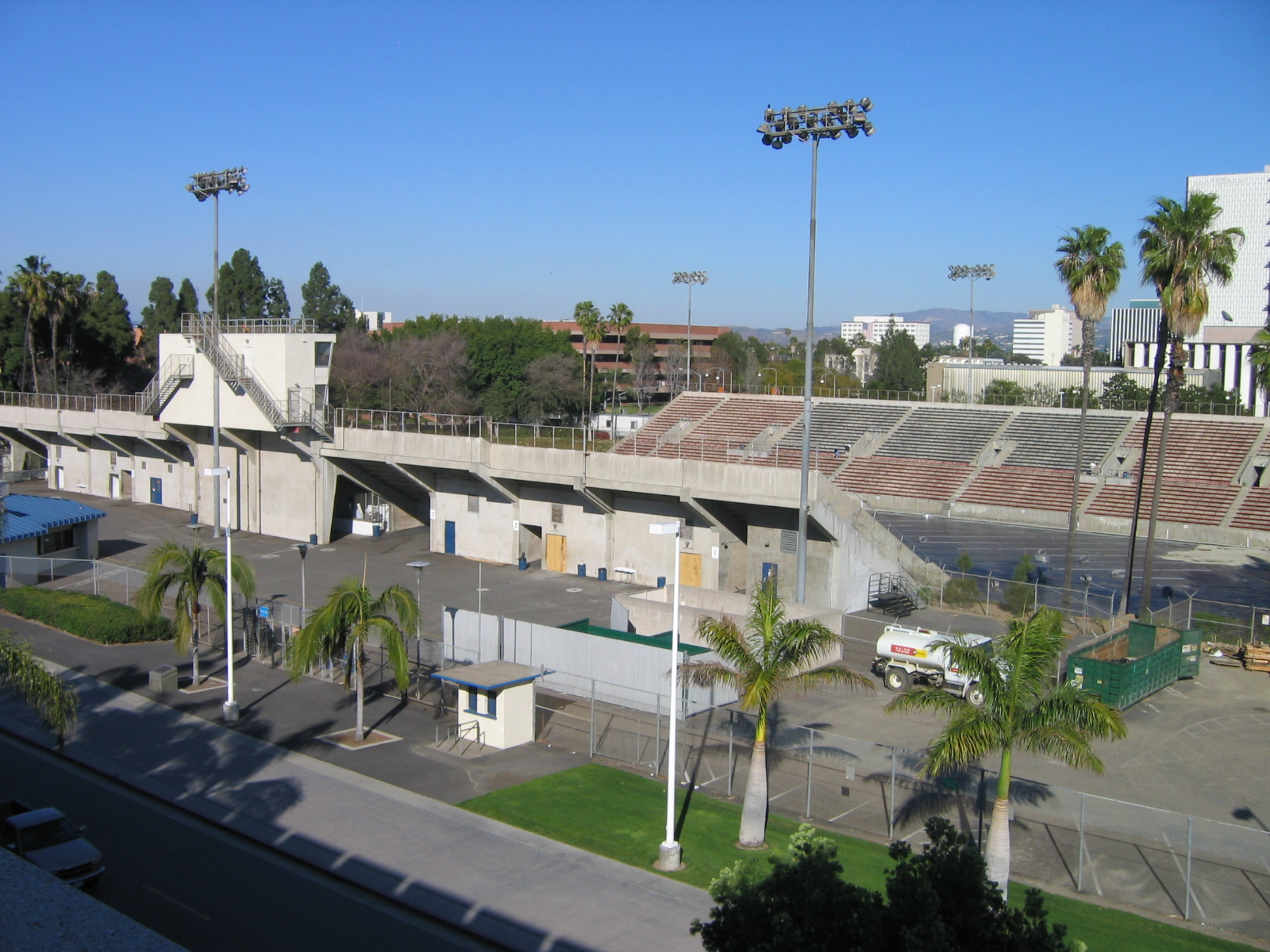

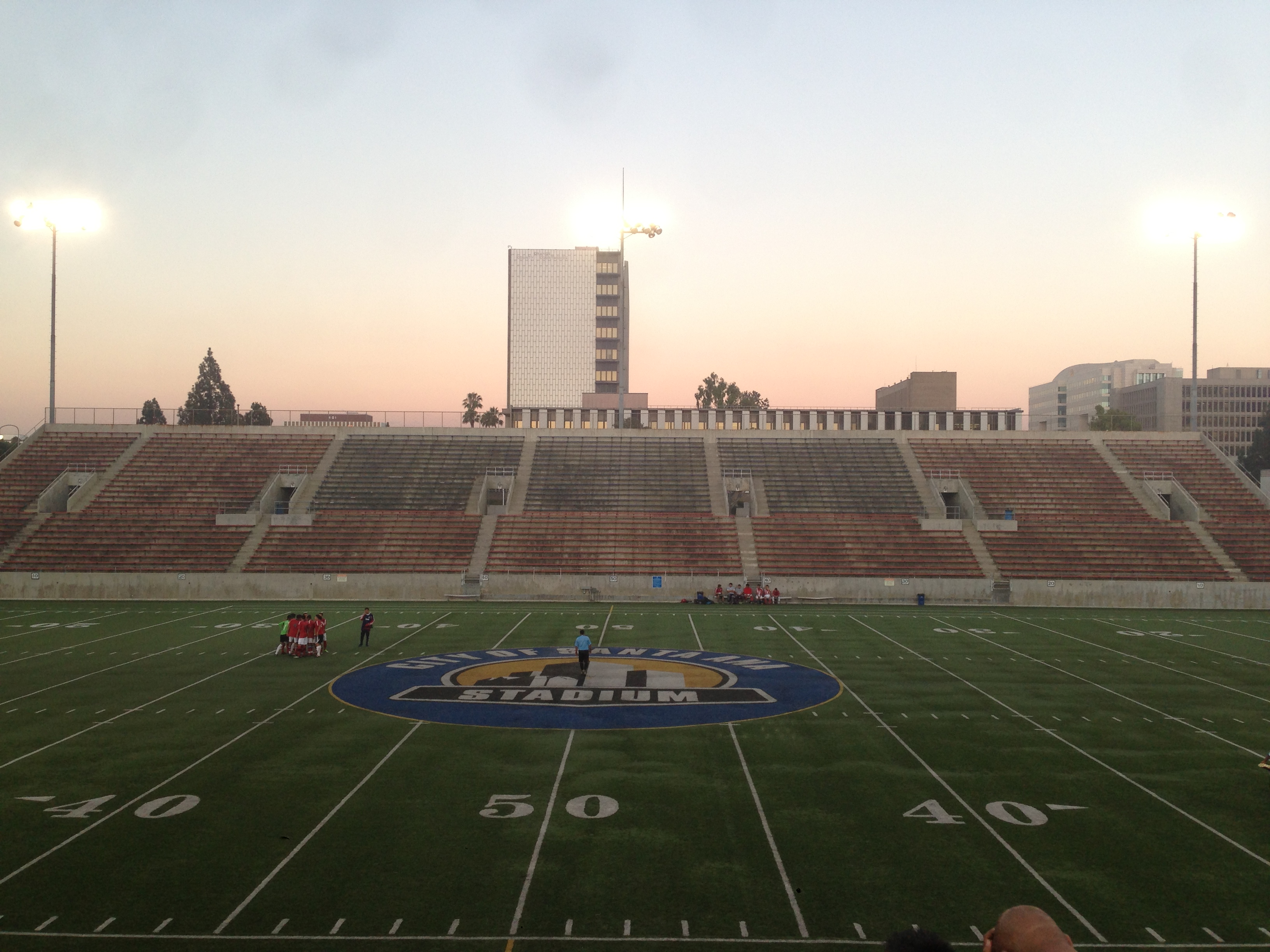
