= Orange County Soccer Club =

Flag of Orange County, California

Orange County Soccer Club was a Greater Los Angeles team active in the mid-1960s in a league called the Continental League. One of the highlights of its existence included an international match with Bayern Munich of Germany played on June 10, 1966, at Santa Ana Stadium in which the clubs played to a 3–3 tie. In 2014, local soccer supporter Blaine Jenks, a founder of an Orange County Blues FC supporter group called the County Line Coalition, discovered information of the match between OCSC and Bayern Munich.

In 1966, the Orange County Soccer Club played the final of the national tournament, the National Challenge Cup (now called the U.S. Open Cup), and played it again in 1967, but was unable to become champion on both occasions.

== Known Players ==
The brothers Bayardo Abaunza and Manuel Abaunza, originally from Nicaragua, played for the Orange County Soccer Club in the mid-1960s as did Werner Mata.

== See also ==
- Bayardo Abaunza
- Manuel Abaunza
- Werner Mata
- Santa Ana Stadium
- Orange County Blues FC
- History of the U.S. Open Cup
- Lamar Hunt U.S. Open Cup
