= 1966 National Challenge Cup =

- Dewar Challenge Cup

Tournament details
- Country: United States

Final positions
- Champions: Philadelphia Ukrainian Nationals (4th title)
- Runners-up: Orange County Soccer Club
- 1967 CONCACAF Champions' Cup: Philadelphia Ukrainian Nationals

The 1966 National Challenge Cup was the 53rd edition of the USSFA's annual open soccer championship. The Philadelphia Ukrainians defeated the Orange County Soccer Club to win.

== Final ==
May 22, 1966

Orange County (CA)	0–1	Ukrainian Nationals (PA)
		78' Carlos Yacovino

Rancho La Cienga Stadium, Los Angeles, California

June 5, 1966

Ukrainian Nationals (PA)	3–0	Orange County (CA)
George Benitez 18'; Carlos Yacovino 28' (pen.); Henry Wagner 35'

Cambria Stadium Philadelphia Pennsylvania
Attendance: 3,000
