= Home Run Derby (1960 TV series) =

1960 television series

- Written by: Jack Harvey
- Directed by: Benjamin Stoloff
- Presented by: Mark Scott
- Country of origin: United States
- No. of episodes: 26

Production
- Producer: Lou Breslow
- Cinematography: Dick Rawlings
- Editor: Tony Martinelli
- Running time: 30 minutes
- Production companies: Ziv Television Programs; Homer Productions

Original release
- Network: Syndication
- Release: January 9 – July 2, 1960

Home Run Derby is a 1960 television show that was held at Wrigley Field in Los Angeles pitting the top sluggers of Major League Baseball against each other in nine-inning home run contests. The show was produced and hosted by actor/broadcaster Mark Scott and distributed by Ziv Television Programs.

Filmed in December 1959, the series aired in syndication from January 9 to July 2, 1960, and helped inspire the Home Run Derby event that is now held the day before the annual Major League Baseball All-Star Game.

== Rules ==
Each batter had nine innings to hit as many home runs as possible. Each inning consisted of three outs, and any ball not hit for a home run, including called strikes, would be recorded as an out. If the two batters tied, extra innings would be played until the tie was broken. Left field was 340 feet away, with right field 339.

Beginning in center field and continuing all the way to the right field foul pole was an inner fence. Hitting a ball into the seats in right center field would count as a home run, but if a ball was hit to straightaway right field, it would have to clear both the inner fence and the wall behind it to count. Otherwise, it would be ruled an out.

While one player was taking his turn at bat, the other player would sit at the host's booth and have a brief conversation, typically unrehearsed small talk about the contest or the player's performance that season. Sometimes when the batter hit a ball into the deep outfield, the player in the booth would comment that it would have gone for extra bases in a real game, to which Scott replied that "on Home Run Derby it's nothing but an out." Some players wore golf gloves during the show—a notable addition because the batting glove was still years away from being a normal part of a player's gear.

== Participants ==
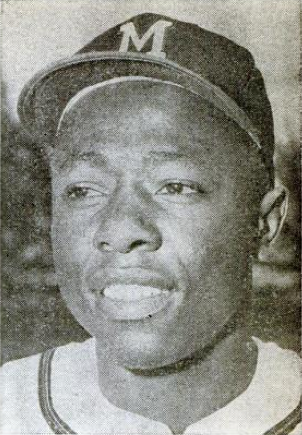
Henry Aaron, 6-time winner on the show

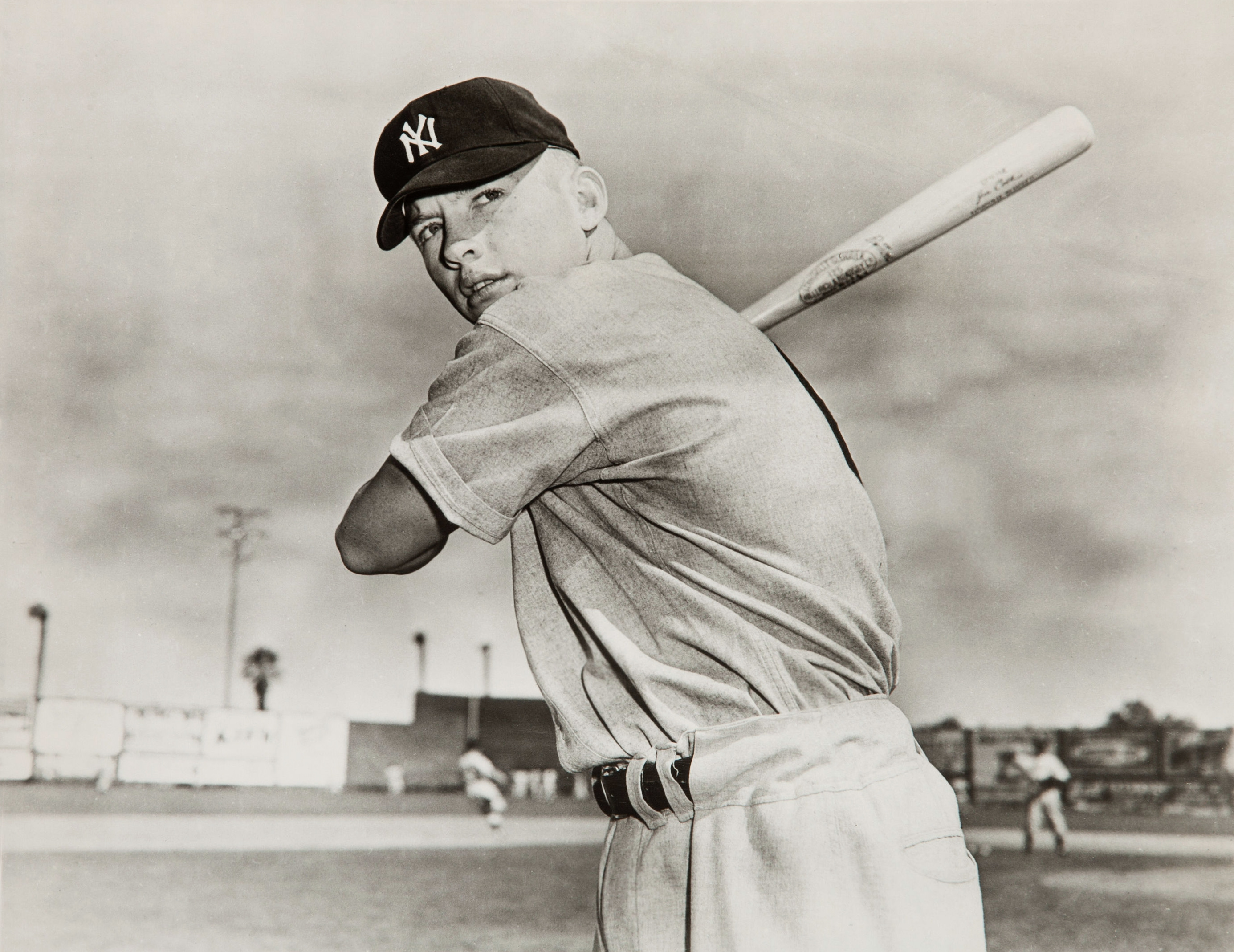
Mickey Mantle, who hit the most home runs on the show

In addition to host Mark Scott, there were other regular participants. One pitcher for the show was former major leaguer Tom Saffell and the catcher was minor leaguer John VanOrnum, later a San Francisco Giants' coach. Art Passarella, a former American League umpire who would go on to a TV acting career, served as the plate umpire. There were also umpires along both foul lines to help judge fly balls that were close calls.

Nineteen players, including nine future members of the Baseball Hall of Fame, participated in the series — "almost all the power hitters of the era." Every Major League Baseball team at the time was represented except for the power-challenged Chicago White Sox, the defending American League champions.

†	Elected to the Baseball Hall of Fame

Player	Team	Appearances	Record	Total HR
Hank Aaron^{†}	Milwaukee Braves	7	6–1	34
Bob Allison	Washington Senators	3	1–2	9
Ernie Banks^{†}	Chicago Cubs	3	1–2	25
Ken Boyer	St. Louis Cardinals	2	1–1	9
Bob Cerv	Kansas City Athletics	2	1–1	11
Rocky Colavito	Cleveland Indians	2	0–2	7
Gil Hodges^{†}	Los Angeles Dodgers	2	1–1	13
Jackie Jensen	Boston Red Sox	4	2–2	29
Al Kaline^{†}	Detroit Tigers	1	0–1	1
Harmon Killebrew^{†}	Washington Senators	4	2–2	23
Jim Lemon	Washington Senators	2	0–2	7
Mickey Mantle^{†}	New York Yankees	5	4–1	44
Eddie Mathews^{†}	Milwaukee Braves	1	0–1	3
Willie Mays^{†}	San Francisco Giants	5	3–2	35
Wally Post	Philadelphia Phillies	2	1–1	16
Frank Robinson^{†}	Cincinnati Reds	2	1–1	13
Duke Snider^{†}	Los Angeles Dodgers	1	0–1	1
Dick Stuart	Pittsburgh Pirates	3	2–1	21
Gus Triandos	Baltimore Orioles	1	0–1	1

Snider and Eddie Mathews were the only left-handed batters to compete. Switch-hitter Mantle batted right-handed in the contests; he hit 372 homers left-handed in his career and only 164 right-handed, but he chose to bat exclusively right-handed for this series, commenting in the first episode that his longest home runs had come right-handed.

Triandos was the only catcher to participate on the program; despite never hitting more than 30 home runs in a season and ending his career with 167 home runs, he was chosen because he was the best power-hitting catcher in the major leagues at the time. He also took until the seventh inning to hit his first home run, the longest such drought in a contest, and just surpassing Snider, who hit a home run off the trees in the sixth inning of his contest vs. Aaron. Triandos was nonetheless good-natured, treating his futility with a mix of self-deprecation and humorous sarcasm, and wishing Dick Stuart luck after their competition.

Willie Mays, who was a champion later in the run after losing in the initial contest to Mickey Mantle, joked with host Scott during his run that the host should be quiet while he batted for his third consecutive home run (for which Mays would receive a $500 bonus). Scott took him up on it, speaking into the microphone sotto voce, similar to a bowling or golf announcer, whenever Mays stepped up to the plate.

== Notable performances ==
The most home runs in a derby was 25, in the Jackie Jensen vs. Ernie Banks contest (14–11), while the fewest was four, in the Hank Aaron vs. Duke Snider contest (3–1).

Jensen's 14 home runs against Banks were the most a player hit in a single contest. Only one home run was recorded in a contest three times; by Snider, Al Kaline, and Gus Triandos.

Mickey Mantle hit the most home runs on the show, a total of 44 during his five appearances.

Aaron won the most money during the show's run, $13,500. Snider, Kaline, and Triandos each won the minimum of $1,000.

Aaron had the best overall record at 6–1, while Rocky Colavito and Jim Lemon were each 0–2.

Jensen was the only player to hit four and subsequently five home runs in a row, doing so in the fourth inning of the final episode.

== Venue choice ==
Scott noted that Wrigley Field in Los Angeles was chosen to host the event because its fence distances were symmetrical, favoring neither right-handed nor left-handed hitters. Despite Scott's assertions, the left field wall was actually a few feet higher than the right field wall, which slightly penalized right-handed line-drive hitters such as Gus Triandos.

The location was also chosen due to its proximity to television studios and its reputation as a home run hitter's ballpark. The power alleys were posted as 345 ft (105 m), which were relatively close to home plate.

== Prizes ==
The winner received a check for $2,000 and was invited back for the next week's episode against a new opponent (a rarity in that era for syndicated games); the runner-up received a check for $1,000. If a batter hit three home runs in a row, he would receive a $500 bonus check. A fourth home run in a row would be worth another $500 bonus check. Any consecutive home runs hit beyond that would each be worth $1,000.

Each show would end with the host presenting each player with their prize checks (beginning with the loser), and would award separate checks for consecutive home run bonuses. These were actual bank checks, not the jumbo "display" checks typically used today. For example, if the winner hit three homers in a row, they would receive one check for $2,000 and another for $500 instead of one check for $2,500. As an incentive for throwing good home-run-hitting balls, the pitcher who threw the most pitches for home runs also received a bonus, according to the host.

Unlike more recent home run derbies, which usually award prizes in the form of donations to a player's choice of charity, the economic realities of the era meant that the cash prizes earned by the players on the show were a substantial income supplement.

== Cancellation ==
Scott's play-by-play and interviewing style was not very different from many of the announcers of that era (straightforward and upbeat). Scott died on July 13, 1960, from a heart attack at the age of 45; in the wake of his death, the producers decided not to replace him and instead canceled the show.

Benjamin Stoloff, the series director, died September 8 of the same year.

== Episode status ==
The original series is intact, having been rerun on ESPN from December 17 to 28, 1988, and July 10 to October 28, 1989. Its rights now belong to MGM Television. The series proved popular and was credited in part with the establishment of a classic sports network which would eventually become ESPN Classic.

ESPN Classic ran the program in primetime in September and November 2009 after a 2-year hiatus, and still occasionally carried episodes in middays thereafter. In later years the intro, as well as some comments at the close of the show, were narrated by former Los Angeles Dodgers announcer Ross Porter.

In the summer of 2007, MGM Home Entertainment (with distribution by 20th Century Fox Home Entertainment) released the complete series on DVD in three volumes. The complete series is also available on the iTunes Store.

== Results ==
Episode #	Winner (winnings / cumulative winnings)	Loser (winnings / cumulative winnings)	Score
1	Mickey Mantle ($2,000)	Willie Mays ($1,000)	9-8
2	Mickey Mantle ($2,000/$4,000)	Ernie Banks ($1,000)	5-3
3	Mickey Mantle ($2,500/$6,500)	Jackie Jensen ($1,000)	9-2
4	Harmon Killebrew ($2,000)	Mickey Mantle ($1,000/$7,500)	9-8
5	Harmon Killebrew ($2,000/$4,000)	Rocky Colavito ($1,500)	6-5 (10 innings)
6	Ken Boyer ($2,000)	Harmon Killebrew ($1,000/$5,000)	3-2
7	Hank Aaron ($2,000)	Ken Boyer ($1,000/$3,000)	9-6
8	Hank Aaron ($2,000/$4,000)	Jim Lemon ($1,000)	6-4
9	Hank Aaron ($2,000/$6,000)	Eddie Mathews ($1,000)	4-3
10	Hank Aaron ($2,500/$8,500)	Al Kaline ($1,000)	5-1
11	Hank Aaron ($2,000/$10,500)	Duke Snider ($1,000)	3-1
12	Hank Aaron ($2,000/$12,500)	Bob Allison ($1,000)	3-2
13	Wally Post ($2,000)	Hank Aaron ($1,000/$13,500)	7-4
14	Dick Stuart ($2,500)	Wally Post ($1,000/$3,000)	11-9 (10)
15	Dick Stuart ($2,500/$5,000)	Gus Triandos ($1,000)	7-1
16	Frank Robinson ($2,000)	Dick Stuart ($1,000/$6,000)	6-3
17	Bob Cerv ($2,000)	Frank Robinson ($1,500/$3,500)	8-7
18	Bob Allison ($2,000/$3,000)	Bob Cerv ($1,000/$3,000)	4-3
19	Willie Mays ($2,000/$3,000)	Bob Allison ($1,000/$4,000)	11-3
20	Willie Mays ($2,000/$5,000)	Harmon Killebrew ($1,000/$6,000)	7-6
21	Willie Mays ($2,000/$7,000)	Jim Lemon ($1,000/$2,000)	6-3
22	Gil Hodges ($2,000)	Willie Mays ($1,000/$8,000)	6-3
23	Ernie Banks ($2,000/$3,000)	Gil Hodges ($1,000/$3,000)	11-7
24	Jackie Jensen ($2,500/$3,500)	Ernie Banks ($1,500/$4,500)	14-11
25	Jackie Jensen ($2,000/$5,500)	Rocky Colavito ($1,000/$2,500)	3-2
26	Mickey Mantle ($2,500/$10,000)	Jackie Jensen ($3,000/$8,500)	13-10
