= Al Zerhusen =

American soccer player (1931–2018)

Personal information
- Full name: Albert Ferdinand Zerhusen
- Date of birth: December 4, 1931
- Place of birth: Brooklyn, New York, U.S.
- Date of death: January 29, 2018 (aged 86)
- Place of death: Los Angeles, California, U.S.
- Height: 6 ft 0 in (1.83 m)
- Position: Midfielder

Senior career*
Years	Team	Apps	(Gls)
- Cincinnati Kolping
- Los Angeles Kickers

International career
1956–1965	United States	10	(2)
Medal record
Men's soccer
Representing the United States
Pan American Games
Bronze medal – third place	1959 Chicago	Team competition
- * Club domestic league appearances and goals

Albert Ferdinand Zerhusen (December 4, 1931 – January 29, 2018) was a U.S. soccer midfielder who played extensively for the U.S. national team. He is a member of the National Soccer Hall of Fame.

== Biography ==
When Zerhusen was five, his family moved from New York to Germany where he learned to play soccer. He moved back to the U.S. in 1950 and settled in Cincinnati, Ohio. However, he was soon after drafted into the Army. After a period stationed in Germany, Zerhusen was transferred back to a base in Cincinnati. In 1954, he played for the Armed Forces soccer team in Cincinnati. At the time soccer was not a truly professional sport in the U.S. so when Zerhusen left the Army, he remained an amateur with the Cincinnati Kolping Soccer Club. In 1956, he was selected for the U.S. team which competed in the 1956 Summer Olympics. The Olympic tournament in 1956 was single game elimination and the U.S. lost 9–1 to Yugoslavia in the first game, Zerhusen scoring for the U.S. However, in preparation for the games, the U.S. had played several exhibition matches and Zerhusen scored seventeen goals in nine games leading up to the Olympics.

While many sources show Zerhusen's national team career beginning in 1954, none of the U.S. games played during this year are counted by USSF or FIFA as full internationals. It wasn't until the April 7, 1957 6–0 thrashing at the hands of Mexico in a 1958 World Cup Qualifier that Zerhusen earned his first official cap with the U.S. national team. After losing all four qualifying games, two to Mexico and two to Canada, the next U.S. game was an 8–1 loss to England in 1959. However, that year saw greater success for the U.S. at the Pan American games. In the 1959 Pan American Games, the U.S. took the bronze behind ten goals by Zerhusen, including four goals in the game against Haiti. A month later the U.S. began qualifications for the 1960 Summer Olympics, but was quickly eliminated with a loss and a tie to Mexico. In 1960, Zerhusen scored his only goal in a full international when he tied Mexico 3–3 in a 1962 FIFA World Cup qualifier. However, Mexico won the game in Mexico and the U.S. had yet again failed to qualify for a major tournament. Zerhusen continued to play for the U.S. into 1965, earning a total of nine caps, but never again scoring.

By this time, Zerhusen had established himself as one of the top amateur midfielders in the U.S. He was the captain of the Los Angeles Kickers for ten years. In both 1958 and 1964, the Kickers won the National Challenge Cup. The Kickers also made it to the 1960 National Cup finals, but fell to the Ukrainian Nationals that year. In 1961, Zerhusen was with the Los Angeles Scots who also fell to the Ukrainian Nationals in the title series. The Scots lost 7–4 on aggregate, with Zerhusen scoring all four of the Scots’ goals. Over his years with the Kickers and the Scots, Zerhusen was the Greater Los Angeles Soccer League's leading scorer 13 times.

In 1978, Zerhusen was inducted into the National Soccer Hall of Fame.

He was the Director of the Los Angeles Soccer Club. He also coached several of the club's teams.
