= Earl Bell Gilmore =

Earl Bell Gilmore (1887–1964) was the son of Arthur Fremont Gilmore and took control of the family businesses, including the Gilmore Oil Company, in 1918. He was inducted into the Indianapolis Motor Speedway Museum in 1987.

== Biography ==
Gilmore was born and died in the historic Rocha Adobe. After his father's death, Gilmore assumed leadership of his company, merging it with Gilmore Petroleum Company, which he previously founded. The combined company was then renamed Gilmore Oil. According to the Los Angeles Times, "E. B. Gilmore is credited with running one of Los Angeles' first gasoline stations...It is said that around 1910 young Gilmore would load his horsedrawn wagon with gasoline from the family refinery and then wait on the corner of Wilshire and La Brea for automobiles from the city to come by. He sold his product for 10 cents a gallon and purified it by pouring it through a chamois."

== Awards ==
Gilmore was inducted into the Motorsports Hall of Fame of America in 2024.
