= Los Angeles SC =

Soccer club based in Los Angeles, California

- Founded: 1951 (75 years ago)
- Ground: Charter Oak High School; Covina, California
- President: Bjoern Martinoff
- Director: Jaime Roman
- League: USL W League (women)
- 2025: United Women's Soccer (West Conference), 1st of 5; Playoffs: Quarter-finals
- Website: wearelasc.com

Los Angeles SC (LASC) are an American semi-professional and youth soccer club based in Los Angeles, California. Founded by German immigrants in 1951 as the Los Angeles Kickers, its men's teams won the U.S. Open Cup twice in 1958 and 1964. Its senior women's team competes in the USL W League, an amateur league in the United States league system, and plays at Charter Oak High School in Covina, California. The team previously competed in United Women's Soccer between 2022 and 2025.

== History ==
In 1951, Albert Ebert and Fritz Ermert founded the Los Angeles Kickers as a predominantly German immigrant team. Within a few seasons, it shed its German identity and became a powerhouse southern California team, winning the 1956 California State Cup. In 1958, the Kickers won the first of seven straight state cups. That year, it also won the 1958 National Challenge Cup. The Kickers lost the 1960 National Challenge Cup final to the Philadelphia Ukrainian Nationals and finished second to St. Stephens in the league standings. In 1963, the Kickers merged with Los Angeles Victoria and won the 1964 National Challenge Cup as the Los Angeles Kickers-Victoria, or LA-KV according to some accounts. The Kickers continued to absorb or merge with other clubs, namely Germania in 1966, Hollywood in 1972 and Alemania in 1975.

== Seasons ==
List of Los Angeles SC (women) seasons
Season	League	Pld	W	D	L	GF	GA	GD	Pos	Playoffs	Ref
2022	United Women's Soccer	10	3	1	6	15	18	–3	5th	DNQ	
2023	United Women's Soccer	8	4	0	4	12	9	+3	3rd	DNQ	
2024	United Women's Soccer	6	3	0	3	13	14	–1	3rd	DNQ	
2025	United Women's Soccer	6	3	2	1	11	5	+6	1st	Quarter-finals	
2026	USL W League	10	4	3	3	23	21	+2	3rd, SoCal	Did not qualify	

== Honors ==
- U.S. Open Cup
  - Winners (2): 1958, 1964
  - Runners-up (1): 1960

== See also ==
- List of United Soccer League clubs
- Soccer in Los Angeles
