= List of baseball parks in San Francisco =

Early history of baseball in San Francisco, California.

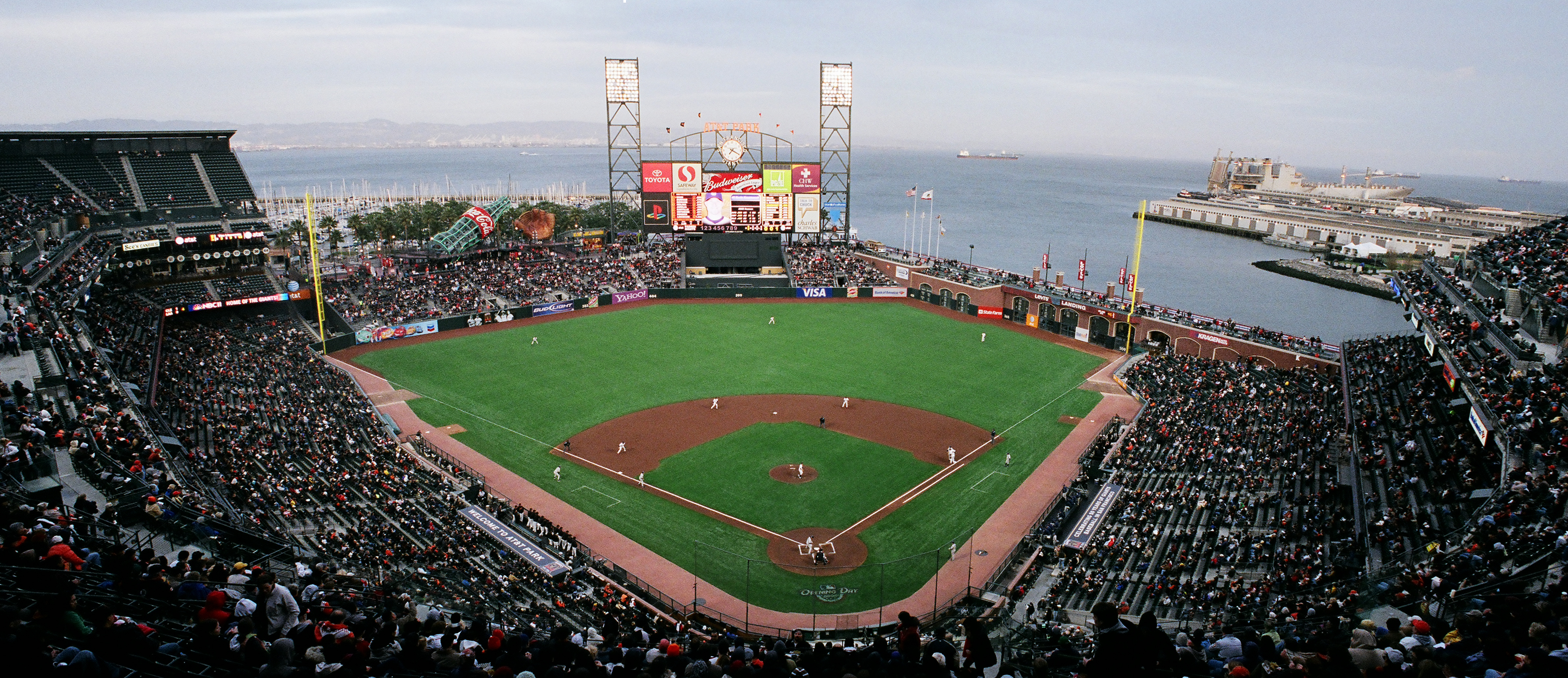
Oracle Park

== Portsmouth Square ==
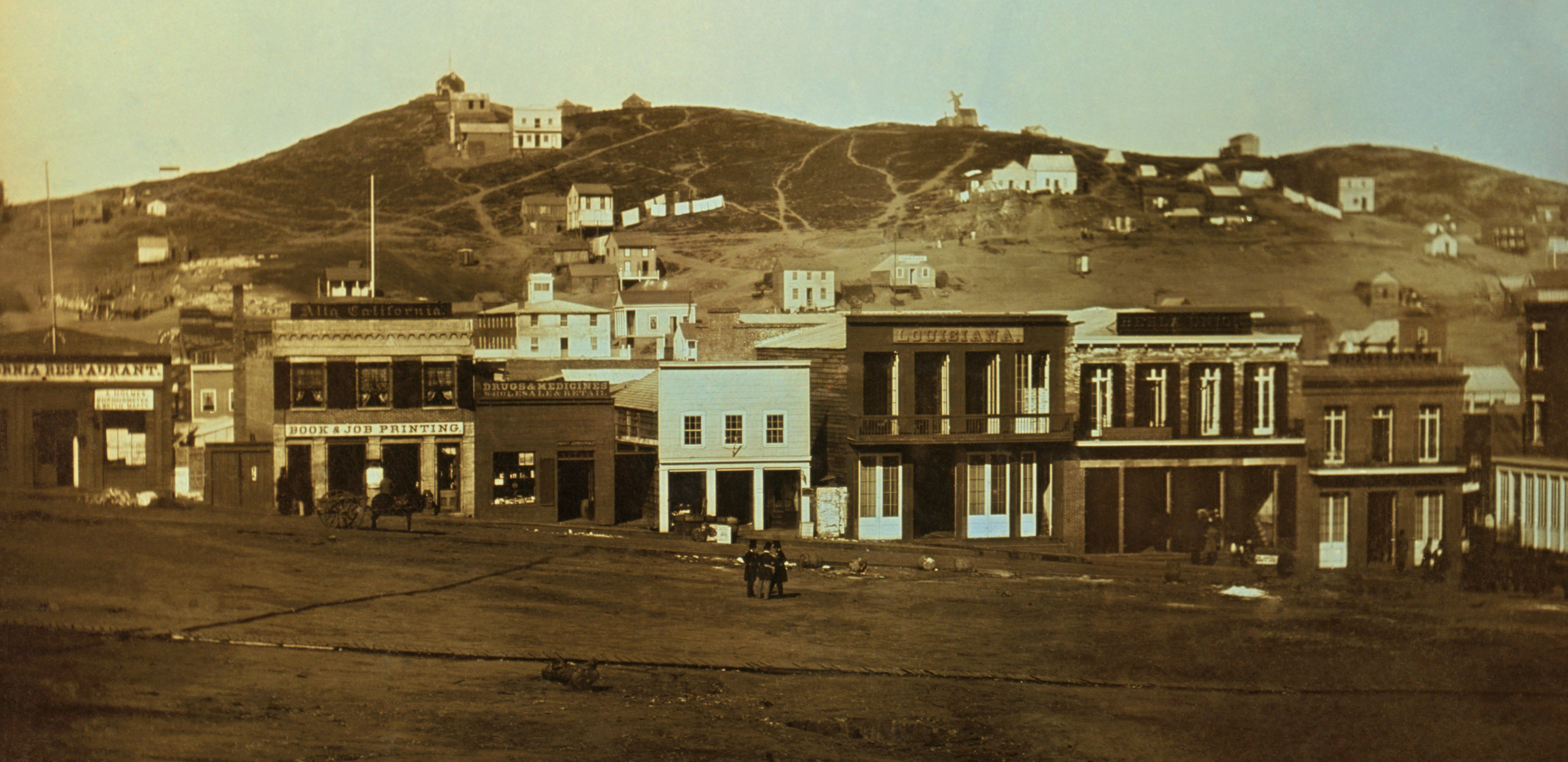
Portsmouth Square looking north, 1851, location of baseball game February 3, 1851

It has been speculated that the game of baseball was played in California by men during the Gold Rush of 1849 when Alexander Cartwright, who is sometimes referred to as "the father of baseball", came to San Francisco and is reported to have brought his baseball to the city in 1849. The Daily Alta California newspaper reports a game of base ball being played upon the Plaza (Portsmouth Square) "by a number of the sporting gentlemen about town", on February 3, 1851. Mention of the play of a game of Townball at Portsmouth Square is recorded in The Daily Alta California newspaper on January 14, 1852. An early town leader serving on the city council as second alcalde, or assistant mayor, of San Francisco during the years 1849-1854 was Frank Turk a New York Knickerbocker. According to historian Frank Joel, baseball was formally introduced into California, at San Francisco in 1859.

== The beginning years, 1860s ==
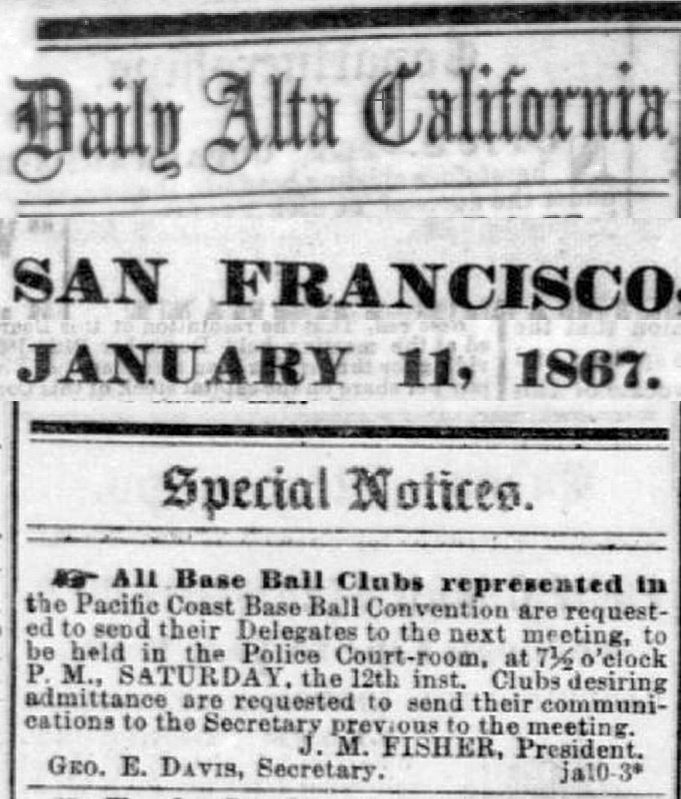
1867 announcement for the formation of the first baseball league in California

In the 1860s, baseball grew in prominence in San Francisco, with the first game reported to be between the Eagles and the Red Rovers on February 22, 1860. The San Francisco Directory in 1860 identifies three base ball clubs, the Eagle, Em Quad, and Excelsior Clubs. In 1867 it was reported that "baseball clubs are now the rage" and the game of baseball drew plaudits from influential quarters. That year marked the establishment of the first baseball league in San Francisco known as the Pacific Coast Base Ball Convention with play 14 clubs from San Francisco, Oakland and Santa Clara county. The San Francisco clubs were named the Eagles, Pacifics, Lafayettes, Knickerbockers, Atlantics, Bay City, Empires, Brodericks and the Cosmopolitans. The 1867 championship game, between the Atlantic and Cosmopolitan clubs, was won by the Cosmopolitans by a score 50 to 45 on April 27, 1867. In the 1870s additional teams were named the Libertys, Wide Awakes (Oakland), Alhambra, Americans, Excelciors and the San Franciscos.

== First baseball park, Recreation Grounds ==
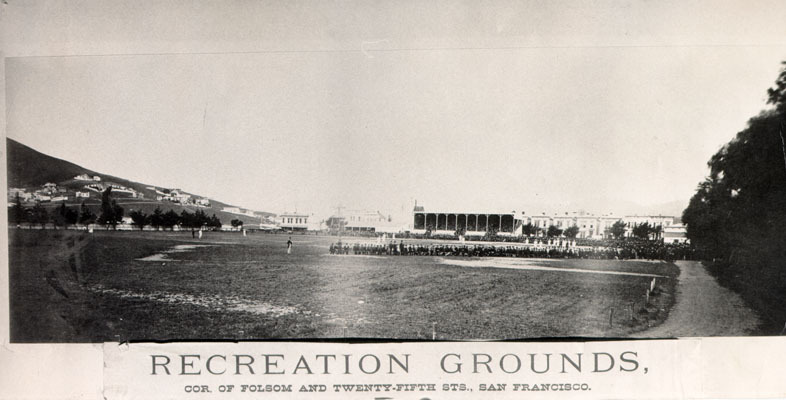
Recreation Grounds

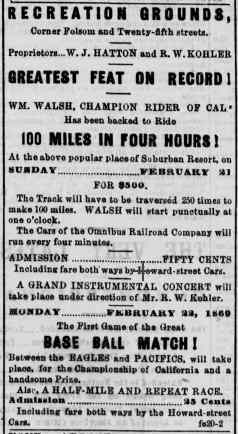
1869 advertisement for baseball championship game between the Eagles and the Pacifics clubs

California's and San Francisco's first enclosed professional baseball park, located in the heavily Irish workingman Mission District, was named simply The Recreation Grounds and opened November 26, 1868 and operated until November 23, 1884. Built on the site of the Pioneer Race Course, a horse race track owned by George Treat, the facility was used for multiple purposes including base ball games and cricket matches as early as October 1860. The grandstand accommodated initially a capacity of 12,000 fans and was later expanded to hold 17,000. Home of the Pacific Baseball League beginning in 1878, the ballpark was owned and operated by the politically active Captain Al Fritz of the influential Workingman's Party of California in partnership with Samuel Shear on land leased from San Francisco Mayor Andrew J. Bryant. In later years, after the death of Fritz, the Recreation Grounds was leased by Waller Walace and Andy Pierce for organized ball play with the preeminent team of that era being the Haverlys. In 1879 league play included a new Military League, organized by newspaper reporter Joseph H. McCloskey, drawn from teams of local militias which were generally aligned along ethnic lines. The period of 1881 to 1886 saw league play from the California League which failed to achieve much organizational competence; during the year 1883, for instance, there were only 36 games among four teams.

The ballpark was bounded by Harrison, Twenty-Fifth, Folsom and Twenty-Sixth Streets, including present day Garfield Square. Photo. Other teams playing in Recreation Grounds included the Eagles, Wide Awakes, Niantics, Woonsockets and Reddingtons. 37°45′2.63″N 122°24′49.33″W

== Amateur and practice fields ==
19th Century amateur and practice fields. During the 1870s and 1880s baseball was a very popular recreation in San Francisco with amateur games and practices held prior to professional games at the professional parks, and at fields located at 15th and Folsom, 25th and Howard in the Mission District, at 8th and Harrison South of Market and at Filmore and Geary in the Richmond. A sand lot baseball field was located at Pierce and Haight Streets, 1886 photo.

== Union Grounds ==
Union Base-ball Grounds or Union Grounds

Opened in October 1879. Used for baseball and for other sports. First reference in city directories is 1880, last is 1882. Location: Brannan Street (northwest); 6th Street (northeast); Townsend Street (southeast); 7th Street (southwest).

== Central Park ==
Central Park

1884–1898 In the South of Market district, known under the name 'Central Park' at the southeast corner (per 1887 and 1900 city directories) of 8th and Market Streets, or 1185 Market Street (per 1905 city directory); a stadium with seating for 15,000, Daniel R. McNeil opened a professional baseball stadium on Thanksgiving Day 1884 (November 27), and was used for play of the Pacific Coast Baseball League from 1886 until June 1887. 37°46′25.81″N 122°24′30.79″W

This ball park on April 28, 1888 became the home of the newly formed California State League. By 1899, the park's days as a baseball venue were over, as it had been converted into a steeple chase rollercoaster and a building housing the "Battle of Manilla" panorama. An indoor roller skating rink was built on part of the site. It opened to the public for the first time on April 11, 1906.[San Francisco Examiner, April 11, 1906, p. 11] One week later, the buildings on the property succumbed to the earthquake.

Location: Market Street (northwest, home plate); 8th Street (southwest, right field); Mission Street (southeast, center field); buildings and 7th Street (northeast, left field); across Market Street from the city hall (per 1901 city directory) 1896 Photo. Initial newspaper reports stated that home plate was "nearest Market Street".[San Francisco Examiner, Nov 10, 1884, p.1], a fact confirmed by the photo.
Home of:

San Francisco – Pacific Coast Baseball League (1886–1887)?
San Francisco – California State League (1888)?

Currently: Trinity Place

- Sanborn map showing Central Park, 1887
- Sanborn map showing Central Park, 1899

== Haight Street Grounds ==
Conny Doyle, 1889, San Francisco Haverlys

Haight-Street Recreation Grounds. Following a league dispute at the Central Park grounds, James Fair established a new ball park in 1886 known as the Alameda Grounds on the island of Alameda (adjacent to Oakland) for play of the California League, which was moved the following year for play at a new baseball park in the Haight District. With grandstands seating 14,000 and located at the terminus of a railcar line. 1887 to March 1895. The borders of this ball park were Stanyan Street (west, first base); Waller Street (north, third base); Shrader Street (listed as "Rader" Street in the 1889 Sanborn map) (east, left field); and Frederic Street (to the south, beyond right field) Photo. It was built across Stanyan from the future site of the Kezar Stadium complex.

Teams playing in this park included

Greenhood and Morans, both of Oakland
Colonels – California League (1887–1889);
Haverlys / Friscoes – California League (1887–1893)

37°46′3.17″N 122°27′5.46″W

- Most of the ballpark, on a Sanborn map, 1889

== California League Grounds ==
California League Grounds a.k.a. Sixteenth and Folsom Street Grounds
Sometimes also called Recreation Grounds, potentially confusing historians due to a concurrent facility with the same name (see next section)
Home of:

San Francisco – California State League (1896 only)
San Francisco Olympics – California League (1897)

Location: Northeast corner of 16th Street and Folsom Street (per 1897 city directory); 16th Street (south, first base); Folsom Street (west, third base); 15th Street (north, left field); Harrison Street (east, right field) (per 1899 Sanborn map)
Currently: San Francisco Animal Care and Control (animal shelter)

- 1899 Sanborn map showing the ballpark

== Recreation Park (II) ==
Recreation Park (II)
Home of:

San Francisco Olympics / Athletics / Brewers – California League (1898–1901)
San Francisco Seals – Pacific Coast League (1903–1906 until the earthquake)

Location: 8th Street (northeast, first base); Harrison Street (southeast, third base); Gordon Street (southwest, left field); Ringold Street (northwest, right field)
Currently: L 7 Leasing Center

- 1899 Sanborn map showing the ballpark

== National Park ==
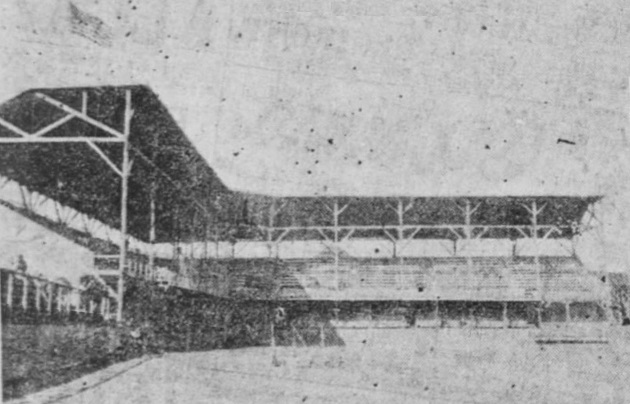
National Park

National Park
Home of:

San Francisco Pirates – Pacific National League (1903 only – folded with the league before season's scheduled end

Location: corner of 9th and Bryant Streets – "a block and a half" from Recreation Park (II)
Currently: commercial businesses

== Recreation Park (III) ==
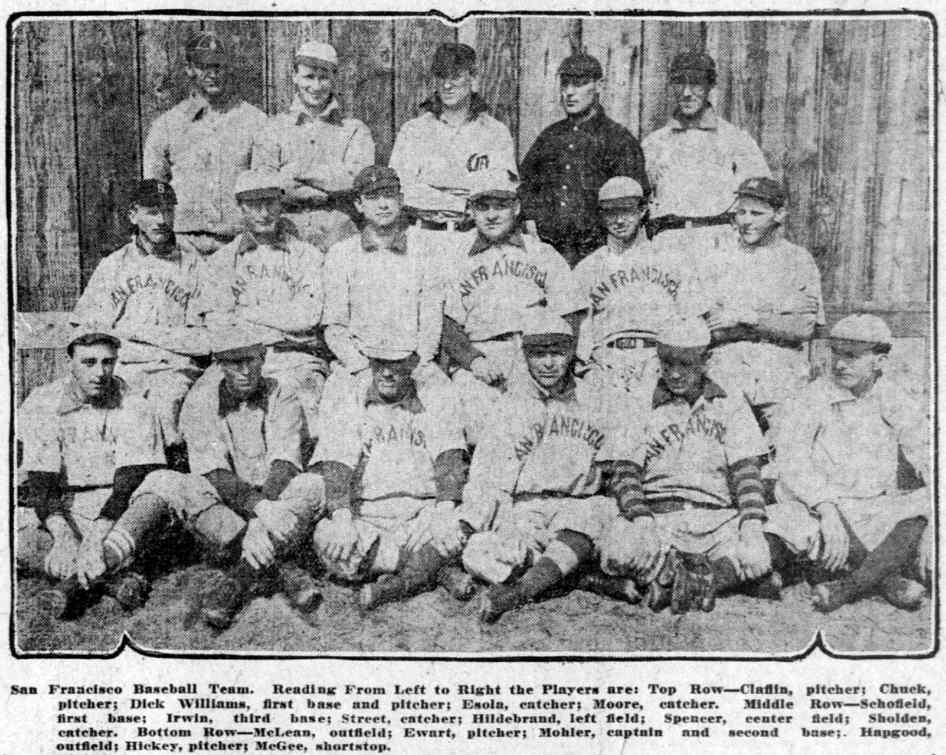
San Francisco Seals, 1907 team photo, inaugural season of Valencia St. Recreation Park

Mission District Recreation Park April 6, 1907 through October 19, 1930 (except for 1914). - 1930s 37°46′1.87″N 122°25′23.93″W

Home of:

San Francisco Seals – Pacific Coast League (1907–13, 1915–30)
Oakland Oaks – Pacific Coast League (1907–12)
San Francisco Baby Seals – California Baseball League (1910 only)
Mission Reds – PCL (1926–30)

Location: 14th Street (north, right field); Valencia Street (east, first base); 15th Street (south, third base); Guerrero Street (west, left field) Photo.
Currently: Valencia Gardens housing project

San Francisco – California State League (1915 only) – appears to have been a road-only team. The league began the season with the intention of playing only Sunday games, figuring to maximize their revenue. Heavy rains in May washed out most of those games, and the league folded at the end of the month.

- 1914 Sanborn map showing the ballpark
- 1950 Sanborn map showing Valencia Gardens

== Ewing Field ==
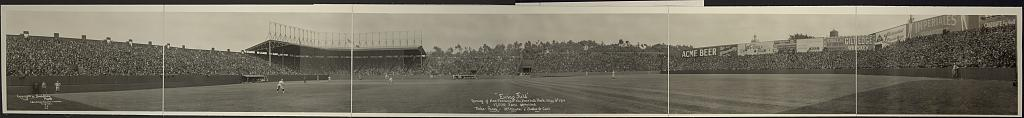
Ewing Field on opening day, May 16, 1914

Ewing Field, 1914 to 1938 (located in the Richmond District, on Masonic between Geary and Turk; the Seals played at Ewing Field for one year in 1914, but returned to the Valencia Street Recreation Park the next year following many criticisms of the cold, windy, foggy weather at Ewing Field) The ballpark continued to be used for local non-professional games. During a game on June 5, 1926, the stadium caught fire from a cigarette, and soon burned down. In the process, embers started fires across the streets and destroyed several homes. With the ballpark fire raging, the firemen concentrated their efforts on protecting the rest of the neighborhood, including the Presentation Convent behind the left field corner of the ballpark. From 1926 until 1938 the field remained unoccupied. In late October 1938, developers announced plans for constructing a new housing development to be named Ewing Terrace.

Home of:

San Francisco Seals – Pacific Coast League (1914)
Mission Wolves – PCL (1914 part)

Location: Masonic Avenue (east, third base); St. Rose's Avenue (now Anza Street, north, first base) and Geary Boulevard (a block north of St. Rose / Anza); Presentation Convent and Turk Boulevard (south, left field); Lone Mountain (west, right field)
Currently: Ewing Terrace (street and housing development)

== Seals Stadium ==
Seals Stadium 1931 through 1959
Home of:

San Francisco Seals – Pacific Coast League (1931–1957)
Mission Reds – PCL (1931–1937)
San Francisco Giants – National League (1958–1959)

Location: Bryant Street (west, first base); 16th Street (south, right field); Potrero Avenue (east, left field); Alameda Street (north, third base)
Currently: Potrero Center, a shopping mall

== Candlestick Park ==
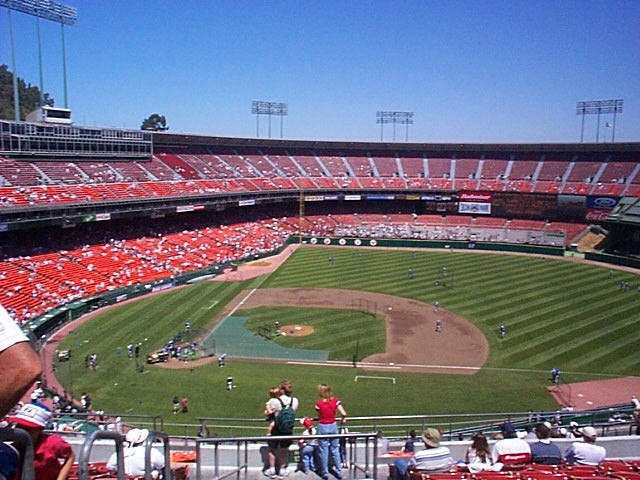
Candlestick Park

Candlestick Park April 12, 1960 to September 30, 1999
Home of: San Francisco Giants – National League (1960–1999)
Location: 602 Jamestown Avenue
Currently: vacant lot

== Oracle Park ==
Oracle Park March 31, 2000 – present; prev. Pacific Bell Park, SBC Park, AT&T Park
Home of: San Francisco Giants – National League (2000–present)
Location: 24 Willie Mays Plaza (home plate); 3rd Street (southwest, first base); King Street (northwest, third base); 2nd Street (northeast, left field); San Francisco Bay Trail and McCovey Cove (right field)

== See also ==
- Lists of baseball parks
- List of baseball parks in Oakland, California
