= Recreation Park (San Francisco) =

Several former baseball parks in San Francisco, California

Recreation Park was the name applied to several former baseball parks in San Francisco, California in the late 19th century and early 20th century.

== Recreation Grounds, Garfield Square ==
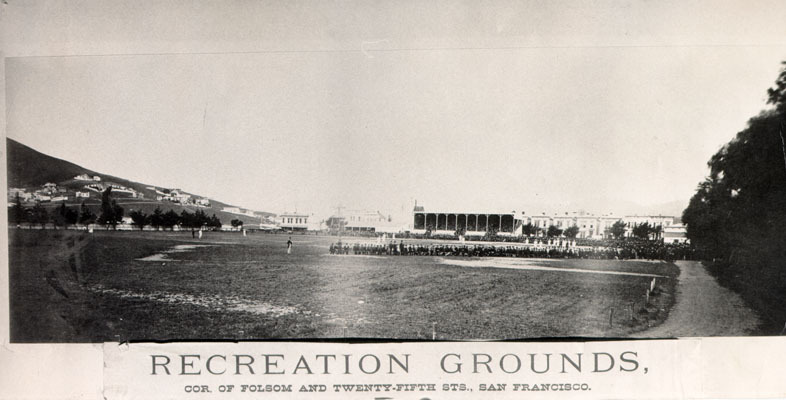
Recreation Grounds, which operated from 1868–1884. Located where Garfield Square Park sits today at 25th & Harrison Streets

Recreation Grounds, opened on November 26, 1868, and operated until May 1884, and was San Francisco's first professional enclosed ballpark. Located at the terminus of a railcar line in San Francisco's heavily Irish Mission District, at the present day Garfield Square. The ballpark was bordered by the streets Harrison, Twenty-Sixth, Folsom and Twenty-Fifth. The opening day ceremonies included the second game of the California baseball championship series between the Oakland Wide Awakes and the San Francisco Eagles, who won by the score of 37–23. The day's festivities included an operatic concert and footraces and were attended by a crowd of 4,000 people. Photo.

== Haight-Street Recreation Grounds ==
Haight-Street Recreation Grounds 1886 –1895. Another recreation grounds existed in the Haight, with ownership transferred to J.B. Gilbert of the Central league on September 8, 1893. and was also referred to as Haight-Street Recreation Park located between Stanyan, Waller, Cole and Frederic Streets was closed in 1895.

- Most of the ballpark, on a Sanborn map, 1889

== Central Park ==
Central Park, also sometimes called Recreation Park, seating capacity of 15,000, opened on Thanksgiving Day of 1884 and operated until 1906. Located at 8th Street and Market Streets, was used by several clubs, including the San Francisco Seals of the Pacific Coast League from 1903. The Central Theatre was built on a portion of the property in 1900. Destroyed by the earthquake and fire on April 18, 1906. The Seals temporarily moved to Oakland while the city of San Francisco was being rebuilt. Photo.

- Sanborn map showing Central Park, 1887
- Sanborn map showing Central Park, 1899

== Recreation Park, SoMA ==
Recreation Park opened in September 1897 for local baseball and football. An early event was the Cal-Stanford Big Game that November. The hastily constructed stands suffered a partial collapse, but there were no fatalities. The following spring, the San Francisco Olympics, also known as the Athletics and the Brewers, began operating in the California League. The ball club lasted through the 1901 season. In 1903, the San Francisco Seals began their long run in the Pacific Coast League. They played at this ballpark until the 1906 San Francisco earthquake put them out of business for a while.

The ballpark was located on a block bounded by 8th Street (northeast, first base); Harrison Street (southeast, third base); Gordon Street (southwest, left field); and Ringold Street (northwest, right field).

- 1899 Sanborn map showing the ballpark

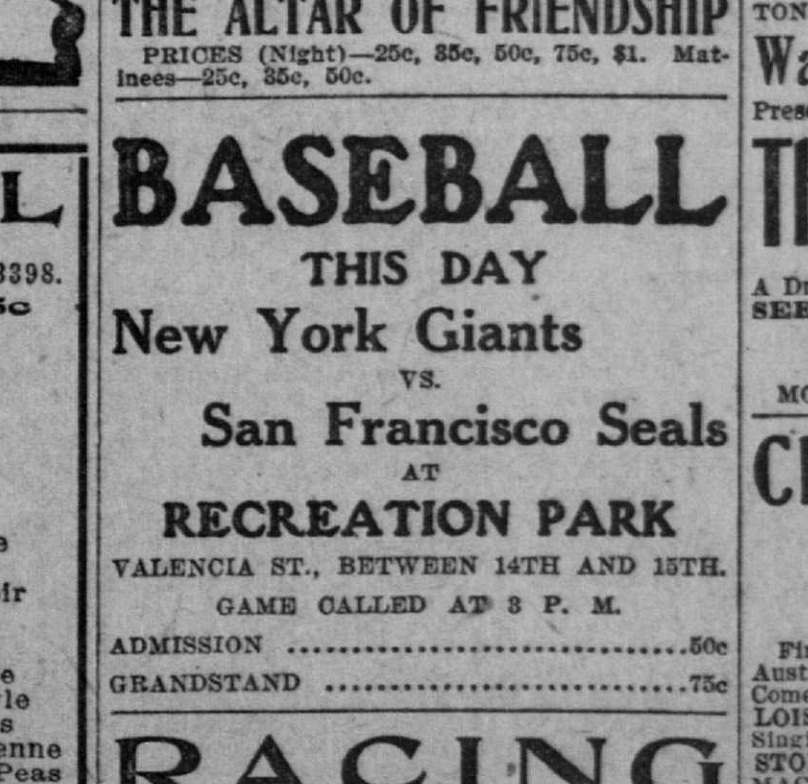
1907 advertisement

== Recreation Park, Mission District ==
Recreation Park, located in the Mission District 37°46′22″N 122°25′24″W, was the best known and longest-lived of these ballparks. It was the home of the Seals during 1907–13 and then 1915–30 after a one-year experiment playing at newly built Ewing Field near the Richmond District. The experiment was a fiasco, largely because of the cold and foggy summer weather endemic to western San Francisco. The Oaks, in turn, had essentially moved into Recreation Park in 1907 and played most of their games there (except Thursdays and Sunday mornings) until their new Oaks Park was opened in 1913, although they continued to play some games in San Francisco until sometime in the 1920s. This congenial arrangement was made easier by the fact that J. Cal Ewing, founding father of the PCL, owned both clubs for their first couple of decades. The ballpark sat 15,000. It also become the home of the Mission Reds (a.k.a. "Missions") upon their arrival in 1926.

The Chicago White Sox held spring training at Recreation Park in 1909 and 1910.

This final incarnation of Recreation Park was on a block bounded by 14th Street (north, right field); Valencia Street (east, first base); 15th Street (south, third base); and Guerrero Street (west, left field) 37°46′3″N 122°25′23″W. The stands were an unusual design, with a small lower deck topped directly above (thus protected from the weather) by a large upper deck, much of which was initially unroofed and open to the sunshine and the elements. The stands were also made of wood. A new, concrete ballpark called Seals Stadium, less than a mile east of Recreation Park, opened in 1931 as the new home of both the Seals and the Missions.

Recreation Park could be safely described as cozy for batting. As shown in the Sanborn map, there were initially other buildings hemming the ballpark in, on three of its four sides, making for a relatively small playing area. Prior to the 1917 season, the club purchased the buildings bordering 15th and demolished them in order to rebuild and expand both the grandstand and the field.

Even after the 1917 expansion, right field was short. In an article about the plans for the new Seals Stadium, for comparison the dimensions of Recreation Park were stated to be left field foul line 315 ft (96 m), center field 340 ft (100 m) and right field line 284 ft (87 m).[San Francisco Examiner, February 1, 1931, p.29]

=== Roberts Field ===
The Recreation Park venue continued to be used for local sports such as baseball, softball and football, for some ten years after Seals Stadium opened. In 1936 the field was acquired by San Francisco State University and redeveloped as a football stadium, including adding lights for playing night games. It was then renamed Roberts Field or Roberts Stadium in honor of the university president, Alexander Roberts. Four years later, the property was sold to the San Francisco Housing Authority. The block was eventually cleared and the site was converted into a public housing project called Valencia Gardens.

- 1914 Sanborn map showing the ballpark
- 1950 Sanborn map showing Valencia Gardens
- Rebuilding during the 1916-1917 off-season
- History of the 15th and Valencia ballpark
- Valencia Gardens

== See also ==
- List of baseball parks in San Francisco, California
- List of baseball parks in Oakland, California
