= List of baseball parks in Oakland, California =

This is a list of venues used for professional baseball in Oakland, California and neighboring cities including Alameda and Emeryville. The information is a compilation of the information contained in the references listed.

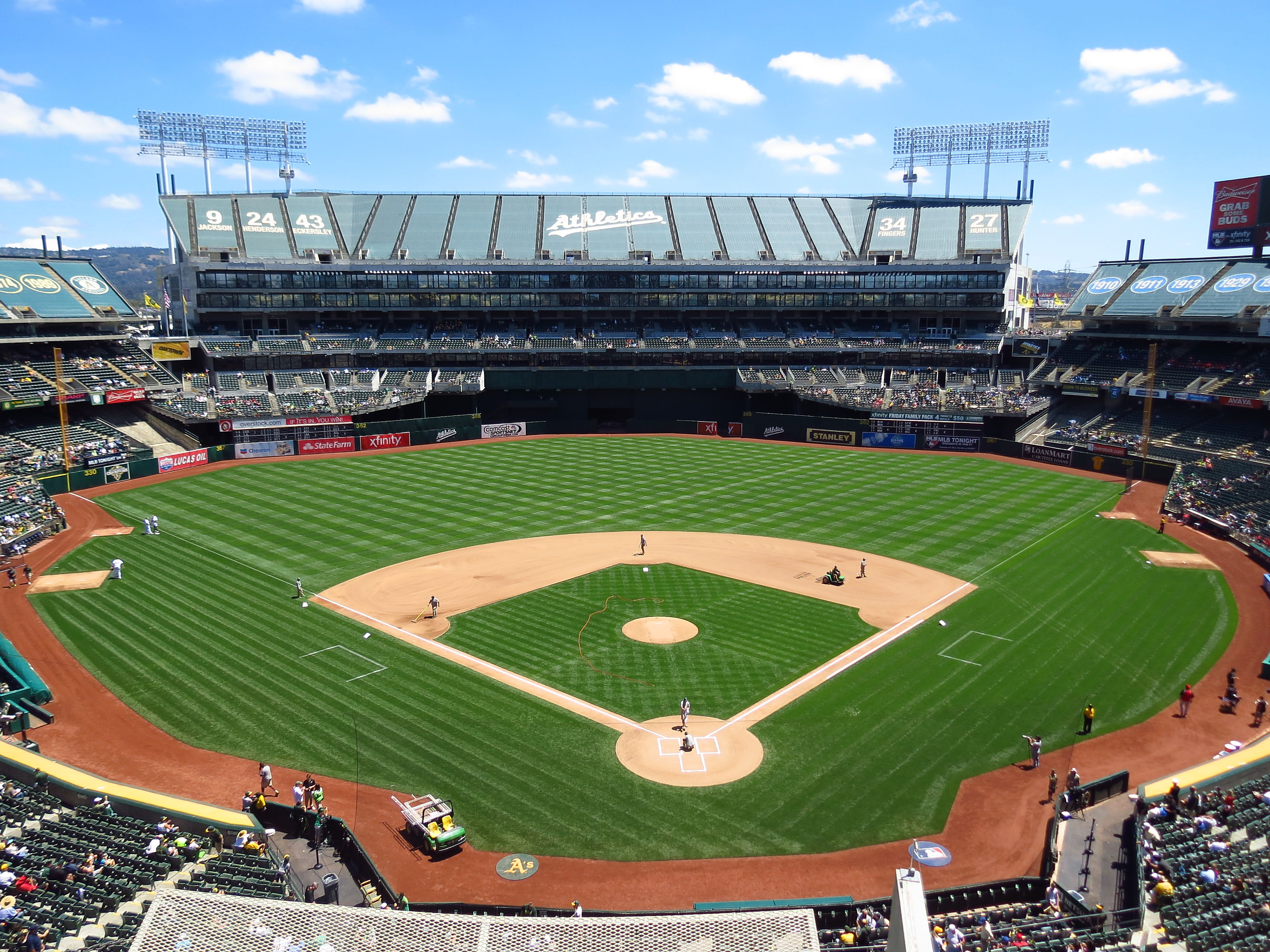
Oakland Coliseum

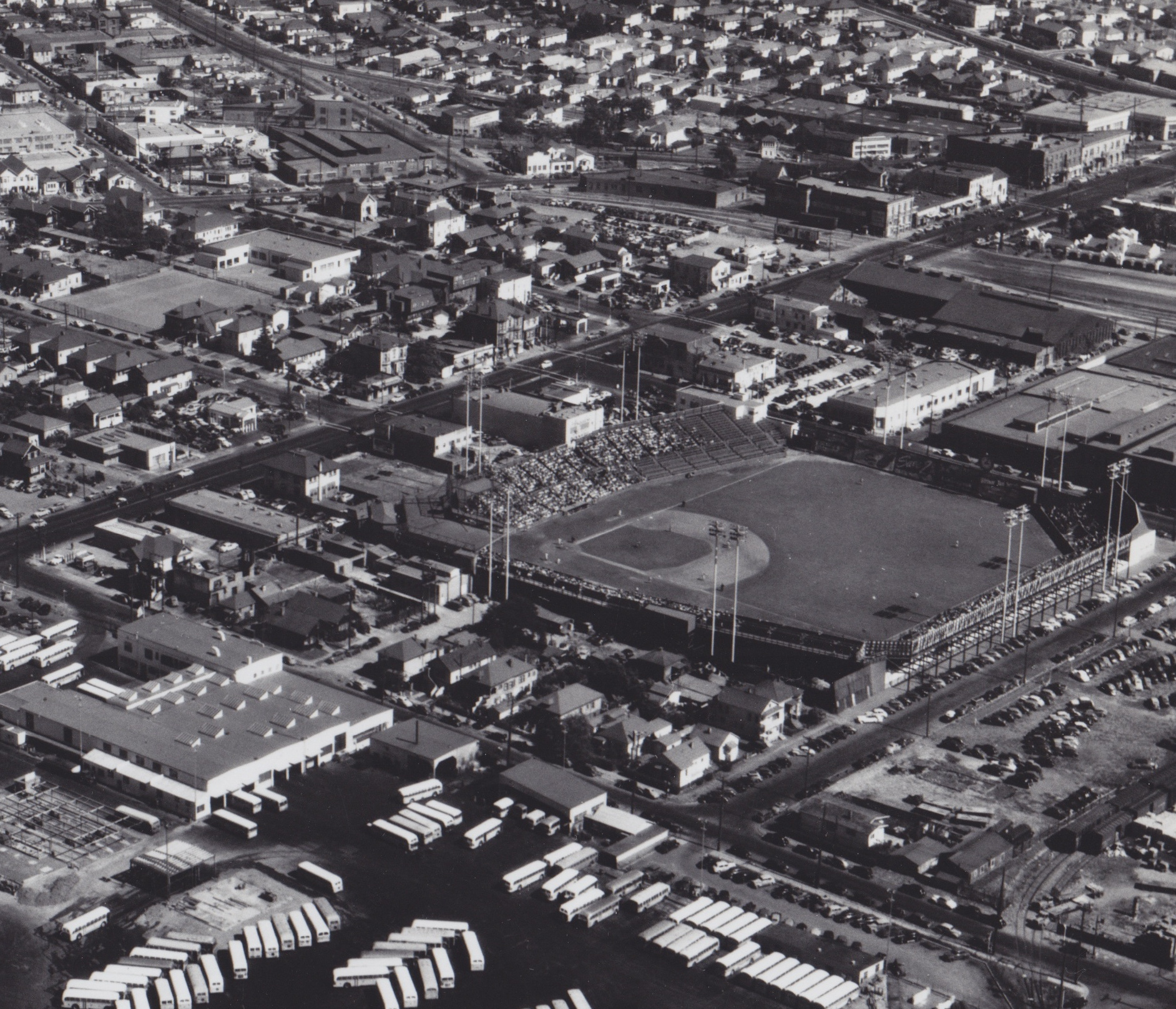
Oaks Park

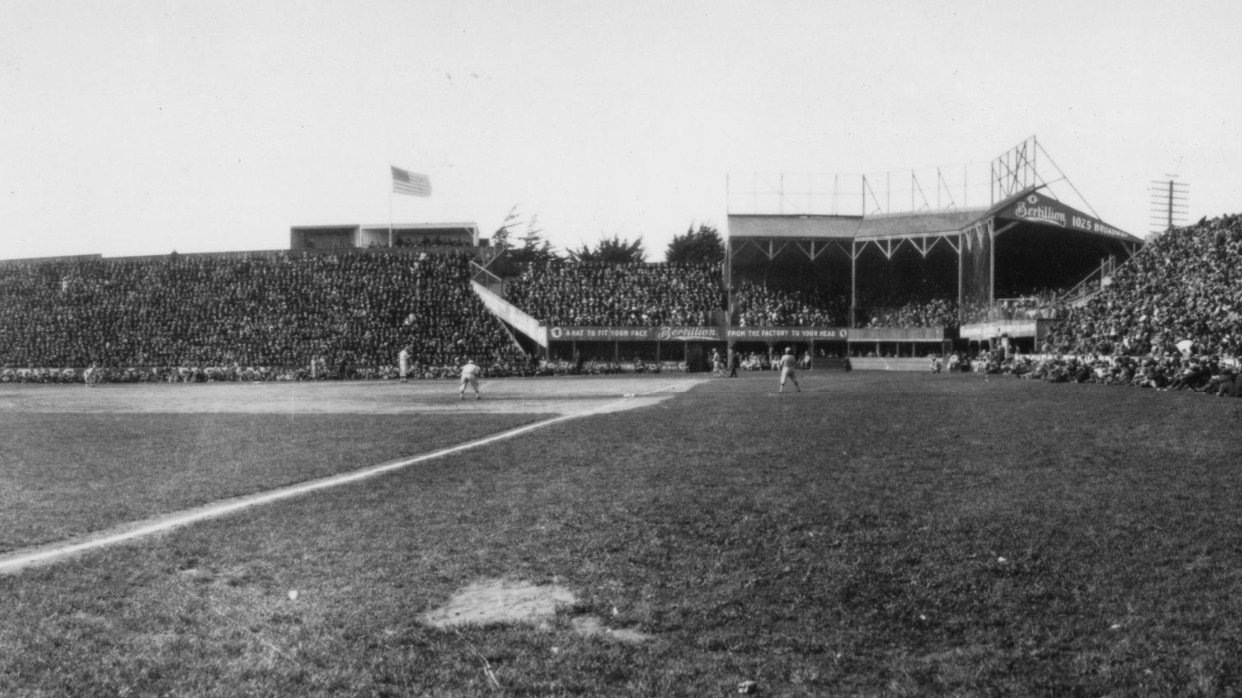
Freeman's Park

Oakland Baseball Grounds
Home of:

Oakland - California League (1879) - back to Rec Grounds in SF 1880
San Francisco - California League (1879) - back to Rec Grounds in SF 1880

Location: 13th Street (south); 14th Street (north); Center Street (west); Kirkham Street (east)
Currently: Industry and small businesses

Alameda Athletic and Baseball Grounds a.k.a. Alameda Grounds
Home of:

Oakland Greenhood & Morans - California League (1886 only - moved to SF in 1887, back to OAK in 1890)
San Francisco Pioneers - California League (moved to SF in 1887)

Location: north of Central Avenue near the site of Neptune Beach; between 7th (later Webster) Street (west); and Page Street (east), in Alameda
Currently: Housing, small businesses, McDonald's

Emeryville Grounds
Home of: Oakland Colonels (formerly Greenhood & Morans) - California League (1890-91)
Location: uncertain

Piedmont Grounds
Home of: Oakland Colonels - California League (1892-93)
Location: 24th Street (north) and Waverly Street (west); at north end of Lake Merritt near Piedmont Baths
Currently: Housing and small businesses

(San Francisco ballparks)
Home of:

Oakland Clamdiggers - California State League (1896-98)
Oakland Colts - Pacific States League (1898 only)

Freeman's Park
Home of:

Oakland Clamdiggers - California State League (1899-1902)
Oakland Oaks - Pacific Coast League (1903,1907-12)

Location: 59th Street (south, left field); San Pablo Avenue (east, third base); buildings and 61st Street (north, first base); buildings and Fremont Street (west, right field); in Emeryville
Currently: Housing

Idora Park
Home of:

Oakland Oaks - Pacific Coast League (1904-06)
San Francisco Seals - Pacific Coast League (1906 after SF earthquake)

Location: amusement park bounded by 56th Street (south); 58th Street (north); Telegraph Avenue (east); Shattuck Avenue (west)
Currently: Housing

Alameda Recreation Park Grounds
Home of: Alameda baseball team - Central California League, etc. (1906-1915)
Location: apparently same as 1886 ballpark
Currently: Housing, small businesses

Grove Street Park
Home of: several local teams about 1909-1918

including Oakland Invaders - California State League (1909-1910)

Location: Grove Street (now Martin Luther King Jr. Way) (west, first base); 57th Street T-ing into Grove from west (first base); Aileen Street (south, right field); buildings and Dover Street (east, left field); alley corresponding to 58th Street (north, third base); about two blocks southwest of Idora Park
Currently: Children's Hospital Oakland and Dover Park

1911 Sanborn map showing the ballpark

Oaks Park a.k.a. Emeryville Park
Home of:

Oakland Oaks - Pacific Coast League (1913-55)
San Francisco Seals - PCL (1914 only)
Mission Wolves – PCL (1914 part)
?Oakland - California State League (1915 only)

Location: 1120 Park Avenue (south, left field); San Pablo Avenue (east, third base); 45th Street (north, first base); Watts Street (west, right field); in Emeryville
Currently: Pixar Studios

Oakland Coliseum a.k.a. RingCentral Coliseum, prev. several other names, orig. Oakland–Alameda County Coliseum
Home of:

Oakland Athletics - American League (1968-2024) - (moved to Sutter Health Park in Sacramento in 2025; to move to the New Las Vegas Stadium by about 2028)

Location: 7000 Coliseum Way and Nimitz Freeway (I-880) (southwest, home plate); Damon Slough (northwest and northeast, left and center fields); end of Baldwin Street (east, right field)

== See also ==
- Lists of baseball parks
- List of baseball parks in San Francisco, California

== Sources ==
- Peter Filichia, Professional Baseball Franchises, Facts on File, 1993.
- Phil Lowry, Green Cathedrals, several editions.
- Michael Benson, Ballparks of North America, McFarland, 1989.
