= Mission Reds =

- 1926–1937; San Francisco, California

Minor league affiliations
- Previous classes: Double-A (1926–1937)
- League: Pacific Coast League (1926–1937)

Team data
- Previous names: Mission Reds (1926–1937)
- Previous parks: Seals Stadium (1931–1937); Recreation Park (1926–1930)

The Mission Reds were a Minor League Baseball team located in San Francisco, California, that played in the Pacific Coast League (PCL) from 1926 through 1937.

== First Missions team ==
In early September 1914, the failed Sacramento Solons team moved to San Francisco and renamed itself "Mission", in reference to San Francisco's Mission District. San Francisco newspapers had dubbed the Sacramento team the "Wolves", in reference to manager Harry Wolverton. The "Wolves" nickname followed them to San Francisco. The local papers also called them "the Missions".

The Mission club continued to play the Sacramento schedule for the final seven weeks of the 200-plus games season. They staged their home games at Ewing Field (the 1914 season's regular home of the San Francisco Seals); and at Oaks Park (regular home of the Oakland Oaks), often playing their Sunday doubleheaders one game on each side of the Bay. The Missions' last home games came on Sunday, October 25, with the morning game in San Francisco and the afternoon game in Oakland.

There was newspaper chatter about the Missions moving to Recreation Park for 1915, but by then they had moved to Salt Lake City, where they became the Salt Lake Bees.

== Origins in Los Angeles ==
The Mission Reds were born in Los Angeles in 1909, where they played under the name the Vernon Tigers. The team won two Pacific Coast League pennants during its 18-year stay in Southern California. Declining attendance forced owner Edward Maier to put the team up for sale after the 1925 season. A group of San Francisco businessmen led by Herbert Fleishhacker purchased the Tigers, moved the team to San Francisco for the 1926 season, and called the team the Mission Reds.

== History in San Francisco ==
San Francisco's second baseball team during this time frame, the Mission Reds, were rivals to the well-established San Francisco Seals. Fans rarely referred to the team by its full name "Mission Reds", preferring instead "the Missions". More often than not, the PCL standings in newspapers listed the team as the "Missions" or "Mission". The terms "Reds" and "Missions" were used synonymously in game reports.

Like its short-lived predecessor, the Mission Reds were supposed to represent San Francisco's Mission District. From 1926 to 1930, the team played home games at Recreation Park, also home to the Seals. When the Seals moved to their own ballpark, Seals Stadium (at 16th and Potrero Streets), in 1931, the Missions followed suit.

The Mission Reds were unable to establish a fan base during their 12-year stay in San Francisco, nor was the team able to replace the Oakland Oaks as the Seals' main rival. For most Bay Area baseball fans, the Missions were only of interest when the Seals and Oaks were on the road and the Missions were playing a compelling team.

The Missions finished first in the Pacific Coast League just once, in 1929; they lost the post-season series to the Hollywood Stars. The team had a 1,088-1,117 (.480) overall record. In 1935, Reds manager Gabby Street was suspended from the Pacific Coast League indefinitely for assaulting an umpire.

In 1938, two years after the original iteration of the Hollywood Stars moved to San Diego, owner Fleishhacker, facing mounting losses on the field and at the gate, moved the Mission Reds back to Los Angeles, and reclaimed the Stars name for the former Mission Reds.
