= J. Cal Ewing =

American baseball executive (1867–1937)

James Calvin Ewing (born 1867 in Suisun, California – died January 19, 1937) was an American baseball executive who was the founder and president of the Pacific Coast League 1907–1909 and owner of the San Francisco Seals and Oakland Oaks.

Ewing co-founded the Pacific Coast League in 1903 with Henry Harris (then co-owner of the Seals). In the aftermath of the 1906 San Francisco earthquake, Ewing used his own money to sustain the league. He was League President 1907–1909.

He owned the Oaks until 1929 until forced to sell, as a result of ill health.

He financed the construction of Ewing Field, which bore his name.

In addition, Ewing is a member of the Pacific Coast League Hall of Fame.
