= Sam Bohne =

American baseball player (1896–1977)

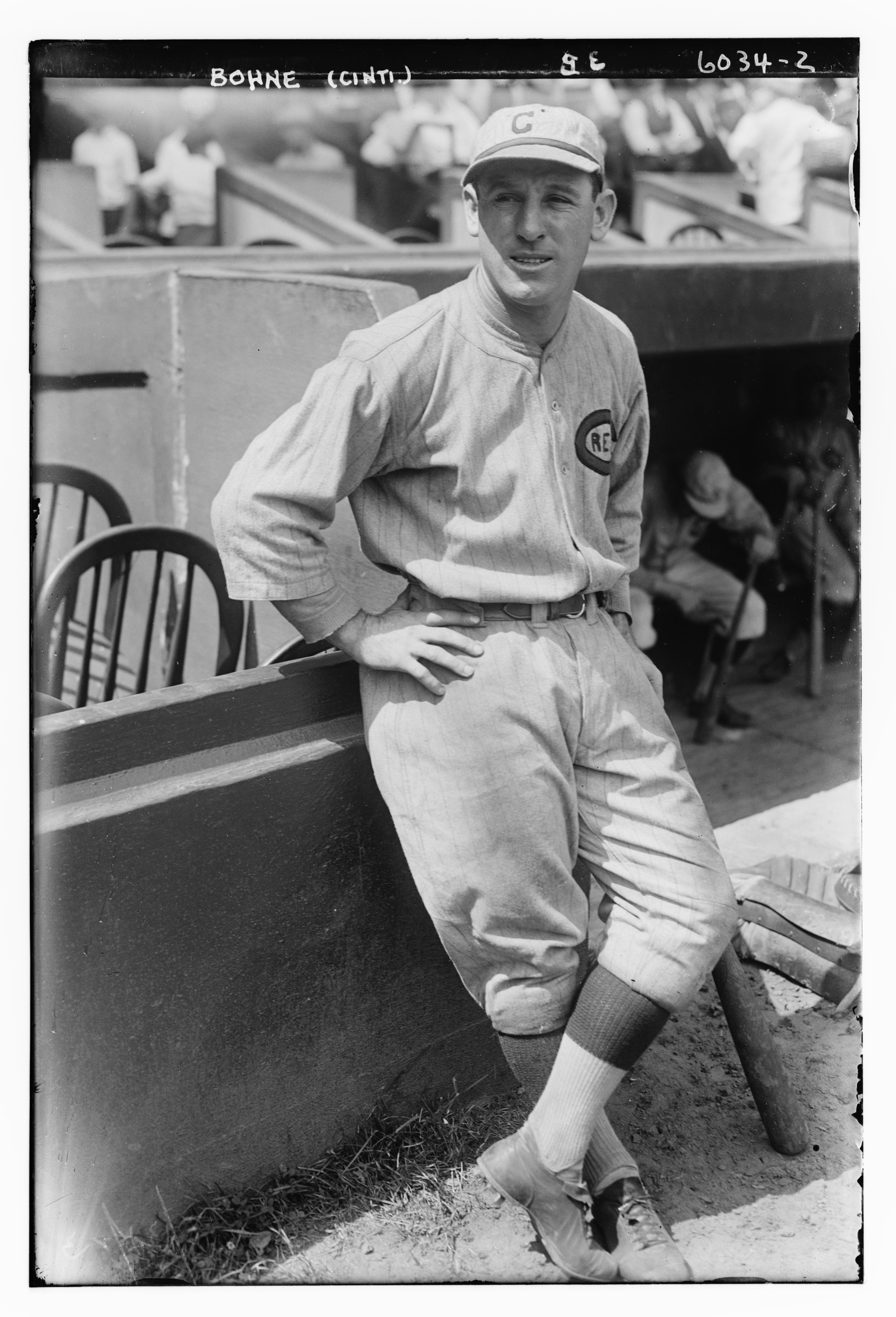
- Second baseman
- Born: October 22, 1896; San Francisco, California, U.S.
- Died: May 23, 1977 (aged 80); Palo Alto, California, U.S.
- Batted: Right Threw: Right

MLB debut
- September 9, 1916, for the St. Louis Cardinals

Last MLB appearance
- September 26, 1926, for the Brooklyn Robins

MLB statistics
- Batting average: .261
- Home runs: 16
- Runs batted in: 228
- Stats at Baseball Reference

Teams
- St. Louis Cardinals (1916); Cincinnati Reds (1921–1926); Brooklyn Robins (1926)

Samuel Arthur Bohne (né Cohen; October 22, 1896 – May 23, 1977) was an American second baseman, shortstop and third baseman who played six seasons in Major League Baseball (MLB).

== Early life ==
Bohne was born Samuel Arthur Cohen to Louis Cohen in San Francisco, California. As Bohne was Jewish and bore the surname Cohen, he decided to change his last name to Bohne in October 1915 amid awareness of how a Jewish-sounding name might affect his budding professional baseball career.

== Baseball career ==
=== Minor leagues ===
In 1915 and part of 1916 (when he also played for the Tacoma Tigers and made his major league debut with the Cardinals), he played in the minor leagues for the San Francisco Seals, and in 1917, he played for the American Association Milwaukee Brewers and the St. Paul Saints. In 1919, he played for the Oakland Oaks, and in 1920, he played for the Seattle Rainiers for whom he batted .333 in 177 games. After his career in the major leagues concluded, he played for the Minneapolis Millers from 1927 to 1929, leading the club with 23 stolen bases in 1927.

=== Major leagues ===
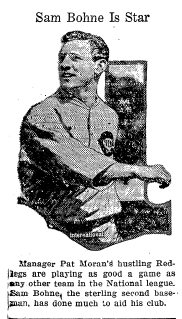
Bohne in a 1923 article in The Evening Gazette

In 1916, when he made his major league debut with the St. Louis Cardinals, he was the second-youngest player in the National League, behind Ed Sicking. In approximately 1917, he was traded by the St. Louis Cardinals with a player to be named later (Bob Bescher), Paddy Livingston, and cash to Milwaukee of the American Association for Marv Goodwin.

He played for the Cincinnati Reds from 1921 to 1926. In 1921, he was fourth in the NL in stolen bases (26), sixth in triples (16), and ninth in runs (98) and walks (54). In 1923, he was ninth in the NL in stolen bases (16).

In 1926, he played the bulk of the season for the Brooklyn Robins.

In 663 games over seven seasons, Bohne posted a .261 batting average (605-for-2315) with 309 runs, 87 doubles, 45 triples, 16 home runs, 228 RBI, 75 stolen bases, 193 bases on balls, .321 on-base percentage and .359 slugging percentage. He finished his career with a .958 fielding percentage playing primarily at second and third base and shortstop.

== See also ==
- List of Jewish Major League Baseball players
