= Garfield Square =

Coordinates: 37.75020°N 122.41222°W

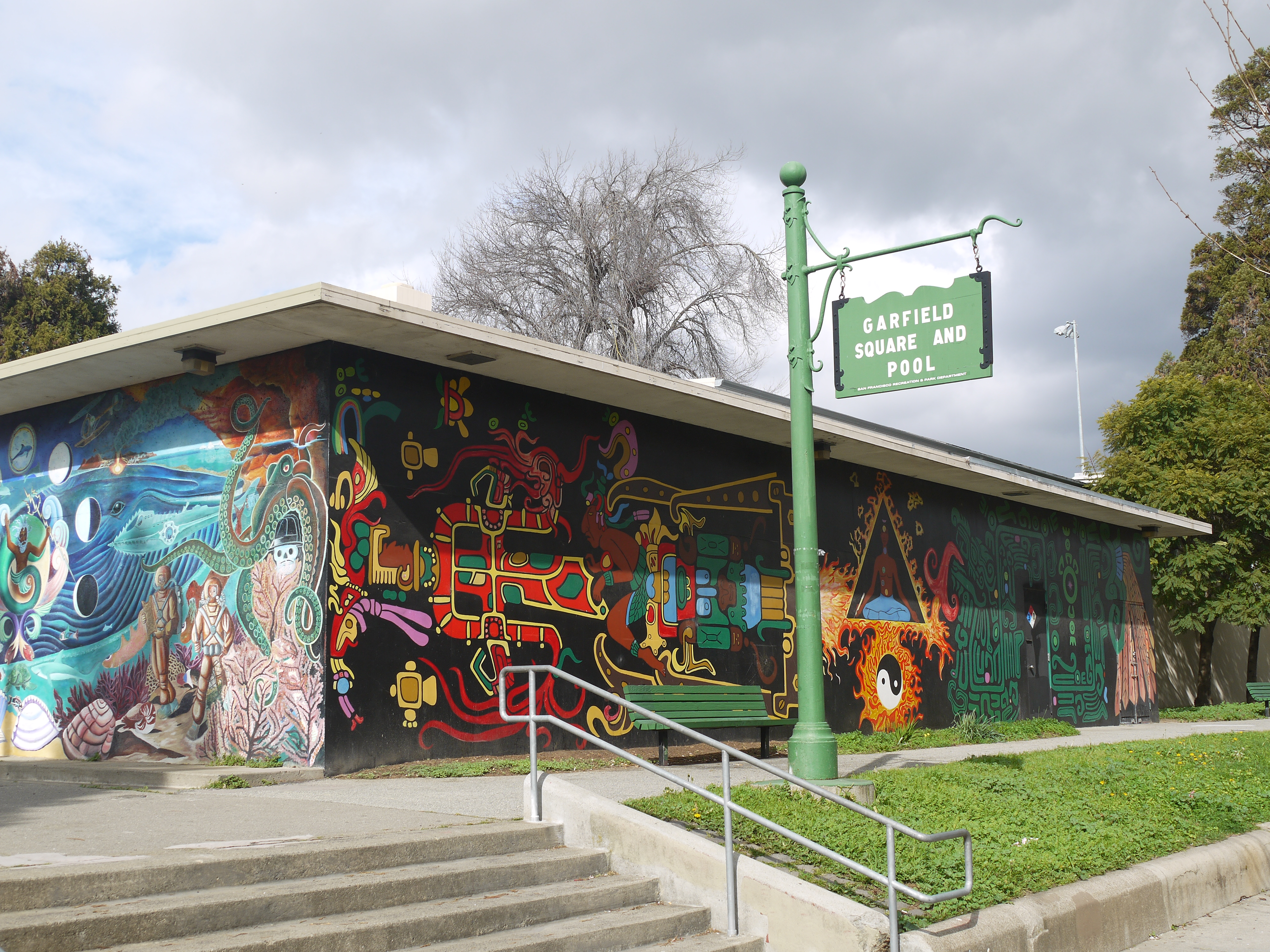
Park's pool building, sign, and murals.

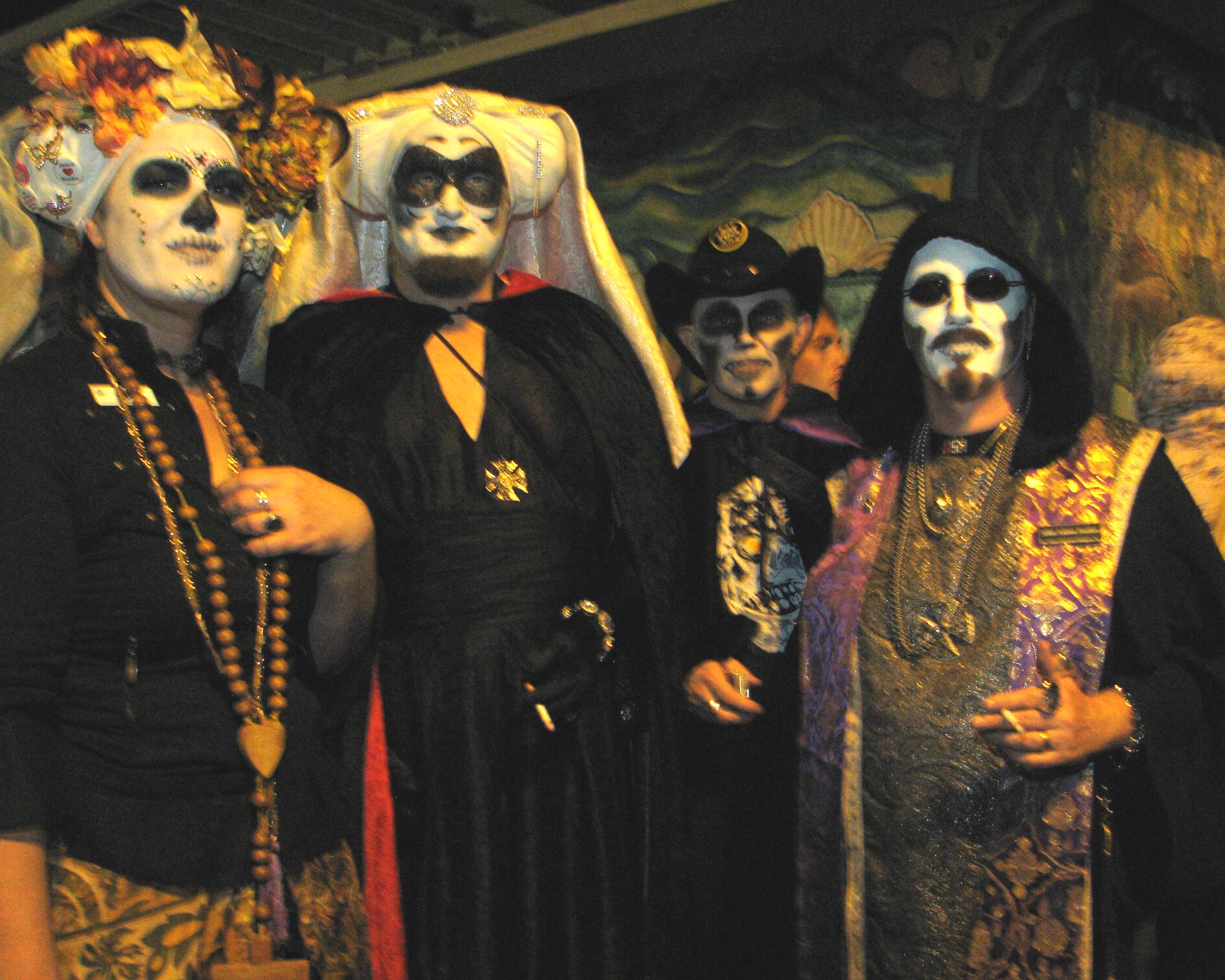
San Francisco's annual Day of the Dead celebration, Garfield Square.

Garfield Square, also known as Garfield Park, is a 3.46-acre (14,000 m^{2}) city park located in the Mission District of San Francisco, California. It is bounded by 25th Street to the north, 26th Street to the south, Treat Avenue to the west, and Harrison Street to the east and was first opened in 1884. Previously the location of the Recreation Grounds baseball park which was the first professional baseball park in California, dating to 1868.

It is a relaxed park with a turf for soccer games, playground, clubhouse, picnic areas suitable for family outings. Also, it has been the site for construction of the annual Day of the Dead shrines and celebration since 1986.

Renovated in 2006, part of a private public partnership between the City of San Francisco and the non-profit City Fields Foundation, brainchild of Bill, John and Bob Fisher, the sons of Gap Inc. founder Donald Fisher.

Location of an indoor public swimming pool, the walls of the building are decorated with Precita Eyes murals, the Primal Sea on the 26th Street side and a mural with Mayan and Aztec themes inspired by Diego Rivera on the Harrison Street side. Garfield Square is located immediately adjacent to Balmy Alley, which is famous for the decorations of murals.
