= Seals Stadium =

Minor league baseball stadium in San Francisco (1931–1959)

- The Queen of Concrete
- Interactive map of Seals Stadium
- Location: Bryant & 16th Streets (right field corner); Mission District; San Francisco, California, U.S.
- Coordinates: 37°46′0″N 122°24′33″W
- Owner: San Francisco Seals; Paul I. Fagan
- Capacity: 16,000 (1931); 18,500 (1946); 22,900 (1958)
- Surface: Grass
- Field size: Left Field – 365 ft (1931), 361 ft (1958); Left-Center – 375 ft (1931), 364 ft (1958); Center Field – 400 ft (1931), 410 ft (1958), 400 ft (1959); Right-Center – 397 ft (1958); Right Field – 385 ft (1931), 365 ft (1940), 348 ft (1958)

Construction
- Opened: April 7, 1931
- Closed: September 20, 1959
- Demolished: November 1959
- Cost: $1.25 million

Tenants
- San Francisco Seals (PCL) (1931–1957); Mission Reds (PCL) (1931–1937); San Francisco Giants (MLB) (1958–1959)

Seals Stadium was a Minor League Baseball stadium in San Francisco, California, United States; it later became the first home of the major-league San Francisco Giants. Opened in the Mission District in 1931, Seals Stadium was the longtime home of the San Francisco Seals (1931–1957) of the Pacific Coast League. The PCL's Mission Reds (1931–1937) shared the ballpark with the Seals for the first seven years, then moved to Los Angeles and became the Hollywood Stars.

In 1958, Seals Stadium became a temporary home for the Giants for their first two seasons in San Francisco while Candlestick Park was under construction. Less than three decades old, Seals Stadium was demolished in late 1959 after construction on Candlestick Park was finished.

== History ==
=== Early years ===
Seals Stadium opened on April 7, 1931, after a construction cost of $1.25 million. It was of concrete and steel construction and was named after its key tenant, the Pacific Coast League's San Francisco Seals. It was uniquely designed to host another San Francisco Pacific Coast League team, the Mission Reds. The ballpark land had been part of pioneer land plots of the "Home Plate Mine", which became an early nickname of the ballpark. Built during the Great Depression, Seals President "Doc" Strub described how laborers would leap onto the running boards of his automobile and beg for the opportunity to work on the project for $3 a day.

With two tenants, Seals Stadium was uniquely constructed with three dressing rooms. One dressing room was for the visiting team, and one for each of the minor league home teams. The stadium had six tower banks for lighting, which were described as the best in minor league baseball at the time.

Opening with a capacity of 18,600, Seals Stadium had no roof over the grandstands, because of San Francisco's little rainfall during the summertime and the fans' preference to sit in the sun. The original uncovered grandstand stretched from foul pole to foul pole. In some years during its minor league days, a live seal was kept in a water tank underneath the grandstand. The field was oriented southeast (home plate to second base), with the right field bleachers bounded by 16th Street.

The initial dimensions of the outfield were planned to be 364 ft (111 m) along the left field foul line, 450 ft (140 m) to center field, and 385 ft (117 m) to the right field foul line. The eventual posted distance to left field was 365 ft (111 m).

For the 1946 season, bleachers were built across the right field area, with the plan to reduce the foul line distance by "about 25 feet". The final distance turned out to be posted as 348 ft (106 m). An inner fence was also constructed across center field, reducing the distance to about 400 ft (120 m).

For the 1951 season, bleachers were built in front of the left field wall, reducing the foul line distance to 347 ft (106 m). This was done at the behest of the Seals' president, Paul Fagan, and the area was dubbed "Paul's Porch". That experiment lasted just the one season, and it was removed in the spring of 1952.

=== San Francisco Seals (1931–1957) / Mission Reds (1931–1937) ===
The San Francisco Seals began play in 1903 as charter team in the Pacific Coast League. They played at the wooden Recreation Park, located at Valencia and 14th Street, before Seals Stadium was built for them. In 1926, the Pacific Coast League Mission Reds (named after the Mission District) relocated from Los Angeles where they had been called the Vernon Tigers. They joined the Seals at Recreation Park.

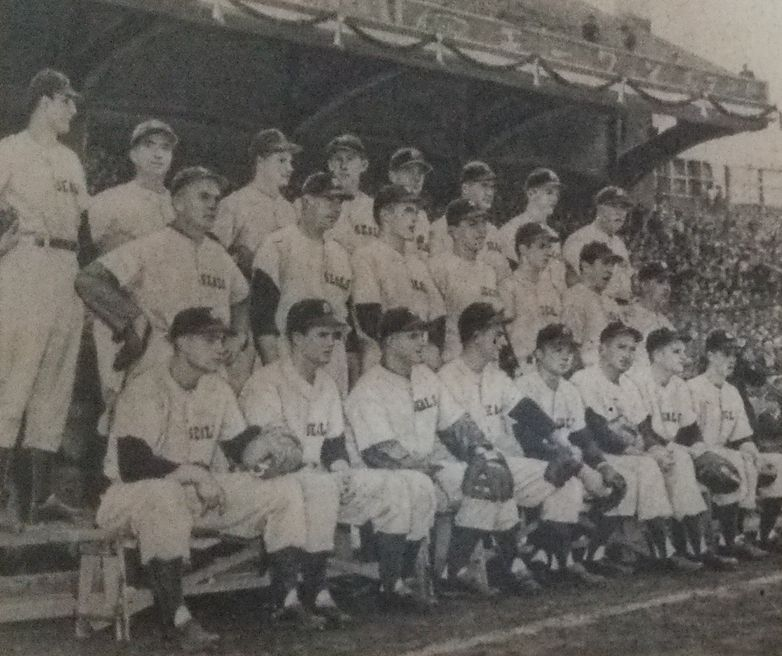
1949 San Francisco Seals in Japan

On March 13, 1931, Seals Stadium officially opened with a spring training game between the Seals and the Detroit Tigers. At the regular season home opener on April 7, 1931, Ty Cobb threw out the first pitch, with 25,000 fans in attendance. The Missions opened their home season at Seals Stadium a week later, April 14 - hosting the Seals.

Notably, Hall of Famer Joe DiMaggio grew up in San Francisco and played for the Seals from October 1932 through 1935. In 1933, DiMaggio hit safely in a record 61 straight games for the Seals, with 169 RBI and a batting average of .340. Another future major league player Gus Suhr had an incredible season for the Seals in 1929, hitting .381 with 51 home runs and 177 RBI. Other notable Seals players included Hall of Famers Earl Averill, Paul Waner, Lloyd Waner, Joe Cronin and Lefty Gomez, as well as Dominic DiMaggio, Vince DiMaggio, Albie Pearson and Ferris Fain.

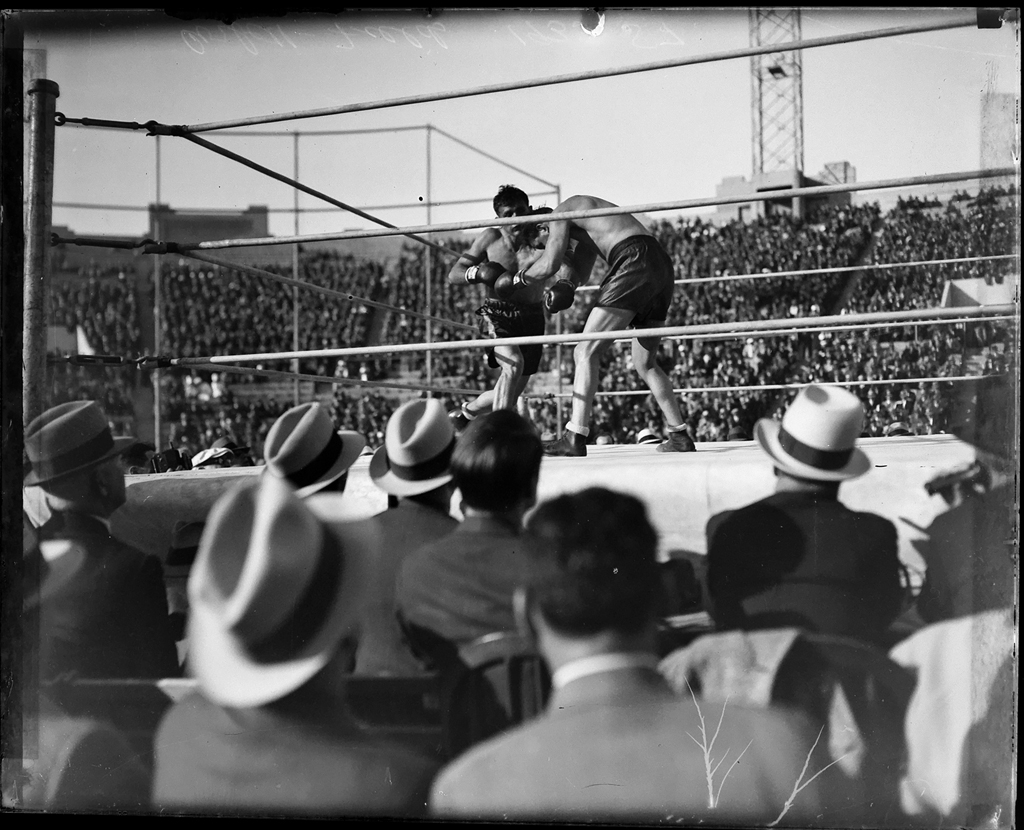
Young Corbett III (facing camera) and Jackie Fields at the Seals Stadium, 1933

Seals Stadium hosted other events. On February 22, 1933, boxer Young Corbett III defeated Jackie Fields at the stadium, earning the title of World Welterweight Champion. Corbett later won the Middleweight Championship at Seals, beating Fred Apostoli on February 22, 1938.

While the Seals remained, the Mission Reds left Seals Stadium and moved to Los Angeles in 1938, where they became the Hollywood Stars, playing at Gilmore Field. The Missions wrapped up their time at Seals Stadium with a doubleheader win over San Diego on September 19, 1937.

After World War II concluded, Seals owner Paul Fagan invested in a stadium makeover. Fagan had all billboards removed and had the entire stadium painted green. Nearby the stadium was the Rainier (later Hamm's) Brewery. The roof of the brewery contained a sign depicting an enormous foaming glass of beer that was lit up at night and was visible from inside the park. Also nearby was the Langendorf Bakery, which sent the smell of baking bread into the ballpark. At the corner of 16th Street and Bryant was the Double Play bar and grill, which was open from 1909 until a fire destroyed it in 2022. It had been described as a "shrine to baseball."

The Seals drew well at Seals Park. In 1948 they set a minor league attendance record, drawing 670,000 fans. This showcased the feasibility that San Francisco could someday sustain and support a Major League franchise and Fagan was posturing to position the Seals to become a major league franchise. In 1950, Fagan briefly halted peanut sales at the stadium, possibly due to cleanup costs. The move was ill-advised, as disgruntled fans brought their own peanuts and hurled the shells onto the field. After the “Peanut Revolt,” Fagan gave away 18,000 free bags of peanuts.

The Seals closed out their time in San Francisco on a high note, winning the PCL championship. The actual final PCL games at Seals Stadium were a meaningless doubleheader loss to the Sacramento Solons on September 15, 1957. The second game was played for laughs, with managers and even the umpire taking brief turns at playing for the teams. The finale was well-attended, with 15,484 spectators. With the Los Angeles and San Francisco markets due to be taken over by major league baseball in 1958, it was feared that the PCL would disband. But the PCL continued, in other cities.

In 1958, after the New York Giants confirmed their intention to move to San Francisco, the Seals relocated to Phoenix, Arizona, becoming the Phoenix Giants.

=== San Francisco Giants (1958–1959) ===
On May 28, 1957, the New York Giants and owner Horace Stoneham announced they intended to leave the Polo Grounds in New York City and relocate to San Francisco. The major league owners approved the move under the condition that the Brooklyn Dodgers would also complete their intended move to Los Angeles. Dodgers' owner Walter O'Malley and San Francisco Mayor George Christopher had worked to partner with Stoneham on the move to San Francisco. Both teams moving to California together made sense for scheduling balance and travel. On August 19, 1957, official announcement of the moves was made. By agreement, both teams would play in temporary locations while each city build a new ballpark. The Giants agreed to play at Seals Stadium while Candlestick Park was under construction and the Dodgers played at Los Angeles Memorial Coliseum, (bypassing smaller Los Angeles Wrigley Field), while Dodger Stadium was under construction.

To accommodate Major League Baseball, more seating was needed at Seals Stadium. A separate uncovered bleacher section was added in left field. This reduced the left field line to 361 ft (110 m), with left-center posted as 364 ft (111 m). The other posted distances were 401 ft (122 m) and 397 ft (121 m) to the center field corners; 350 ft (110 m) to right center field; and 348 ft (106 m) along the right field line. The ballfield remained without a warning track. Given the temporary usage by the Giants, Seals Stadium was not renamed. The original plan was to play just the first year at Seals Stadium, but that proved to not be the case.

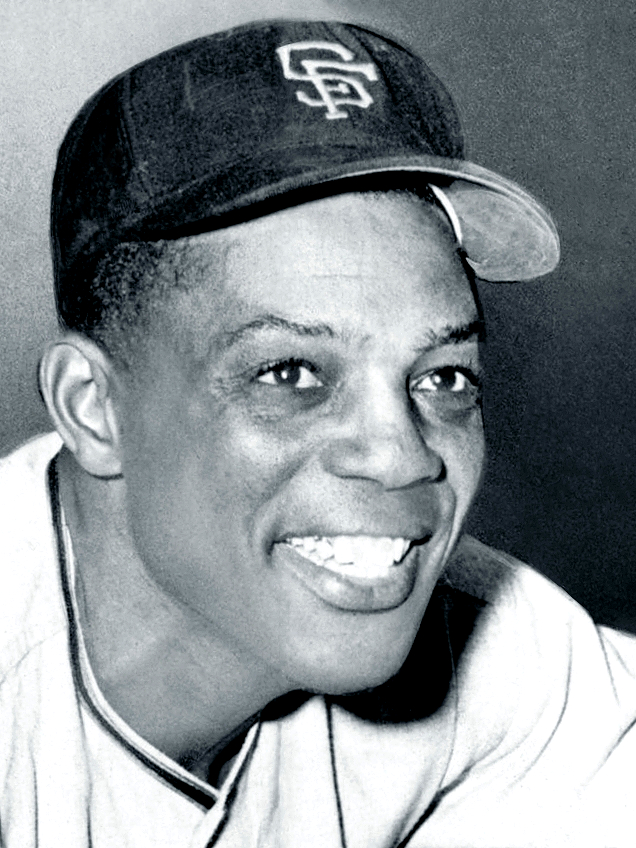
Willie Mays with the SF Giants in 1961

On April 15, 1958, the first West Coast Major League game was played at Seals Park. With Hall of Famers Willie Mays and Orlando Cepeda, the Giants opened with an 8–0 victory over Don Drysdale and the new Los Angeles Dodgers. Mays would go on to hit .347 with 29 home runs in 1958 and Cepeda would win the National League Rookie of the Year Award. Willie McCovey, another future Hall of Famer, then won the award in 1959. Cepeda would hit his first career home run at Seals Stadium on April 15, 1958.

The Giants drew well at Seals Stadium. Finishing 80–74 in 1958, they drew 1,272,625 fans. That increased to 1,422,130 in 1959, when the Giants finished 83–71.

Prevailing winds to left field aided right-handed hitters; of the 45 home runs hit in its first 19 major league games in 1958, 36 were to left field. All-Star Giants pitcher Johnny Antonelli was not a fan of the ballpark, telling reporters after a loss, "A pitcher should be paid double for working here. Worst ballpark in America. Every time you stand up there, you’ve got to beat the hitter and a 30-mile-per-hour wind." A brewery was just north of the venue.

At the time, its weather was thought to be considerably less favorable than the site of the park under construction at Candlestick Point.

The final game at Seals Stadium took place on September 20, 1959. The Giants lost to the Los Angeles Dodgers 8–2 in front of 22,923 spectators.

=== 1959 demolition and site usage ===
With Candlestick Park nearing completion, Seals Stadium was demolished in November 1959. Many of the seats and the light towers were eventually repurposed at Cheney Stadium in Tacoma, Washington.

After demolition, the site (bounded by Bryant Street, 16th Street, Potrero Avenue and Alameda Street) initially housed a White Front department store. For many years after, there were several automobile dealerships after the 1982 demise of Van Ness Avenue's famed auto row. In the late 1990s, the area was converted to a shopping center.

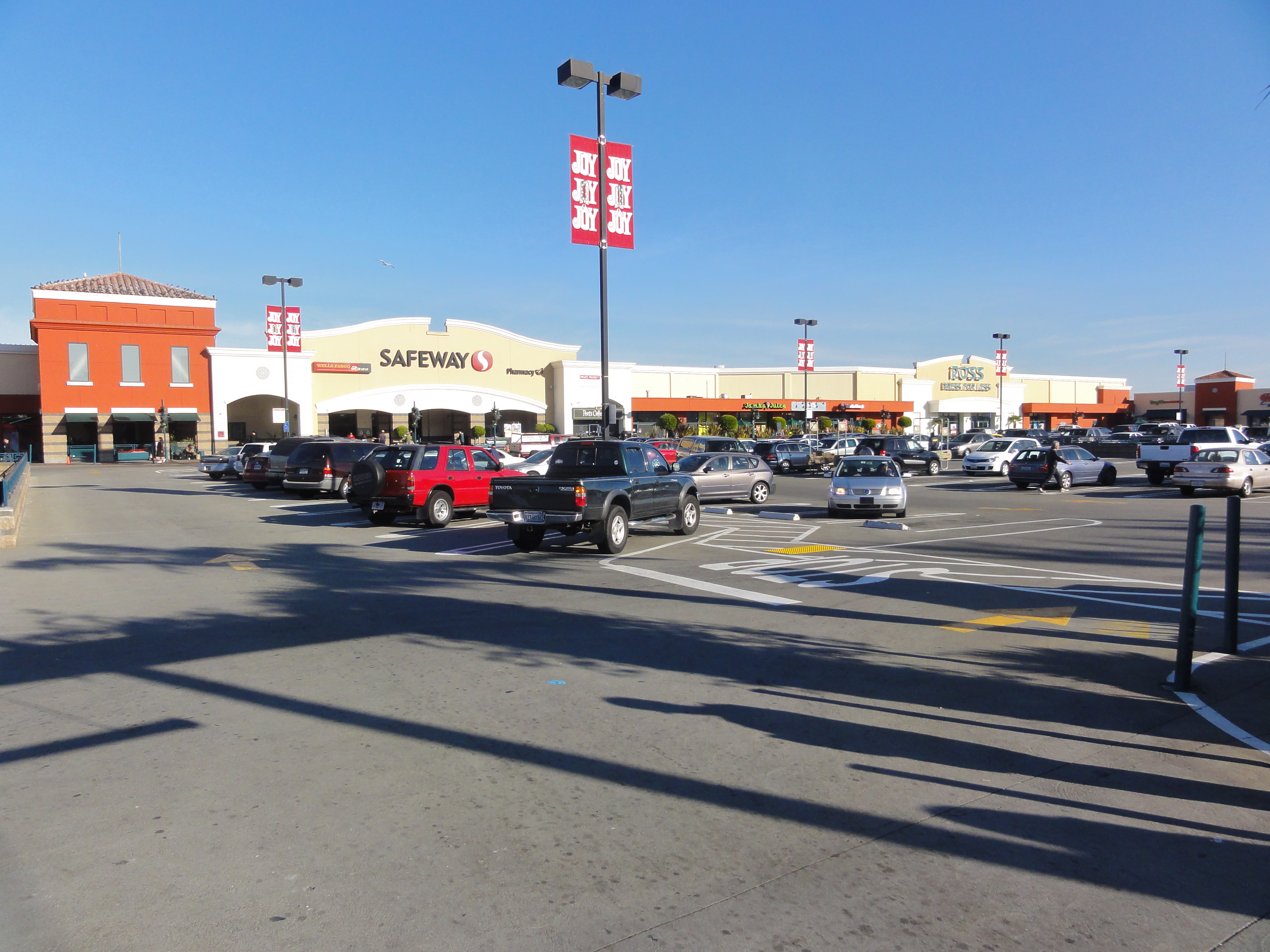
Shopping center at the site of Seals Stadium, 2011

== 2008: 50th anniversary tribute ==
On April 15, 2008, the San Francisco Giants paid tribute to the 50th anniversary of their move to Seals Stadium. There was a ceremony at the Seals Stadium site and another at AT&T Park to commemorate the 50th anniversary of the 1958 Opening Day. The Giants' home game that day – against the Arizona Diamondbacks – was started at 1:35 p.m., the starting time commemorated the same time of day Giants' pitcher Ruben Gomez threw the first pitch at Seals Stadium on Opening Day, April 15, 1958. The first 20,000 fans attending the Diamondbacks-Giants game received a commemorative poster print of the Gomez' first pitch from 1958. Orlando Cepeda and Gino Cimoli, the first men to bat on that historic day, threw out the ceremonial first pitch.

There were pre-game events at the site of Seals Stadium. Ceremonies included the unveiling of a new bronze historical plaque at the site, a recreation of the radio call of the first pitch by Jon Miller, an honoring of Mike Murphy, the Giants 50-year legendary clubhouse manager, as well as speeches/recollections by Willie Mays and others. Among those recognized were Giants Hall of Famers Mays and Orlando Cepeda and 1958 Giants players Jim Davenport and Eddie Bressoud. Descendants of former Giants' owner Horace Stoneham and Mayor George Christopher (both instrumental in moving the Giants from New York to San Francisco) were in attendance.

Preceded by Polo Grounds	Home of the San Francisco Giants; 1958–1959	Succeeded by Candlestick Park
