= Ewing Field =

Former stadium in San Francisco, California

Ewing Field was a baseball park in San Francisco, California. It served as the home of the San Francisco Seals of the Pacific Coast League for a single season, 1914.

Ewing Field was located in the Richmond District of the city, bounded by Masonic Avenue (east, third base); St. Rose's Avenue (now Anza Street, north, first base) and Geary Boulevard (a block north of St. Rose / Anza); Presentation Convent and Turk Boulevard (south, left field); and Lone Mountain (west, right field).

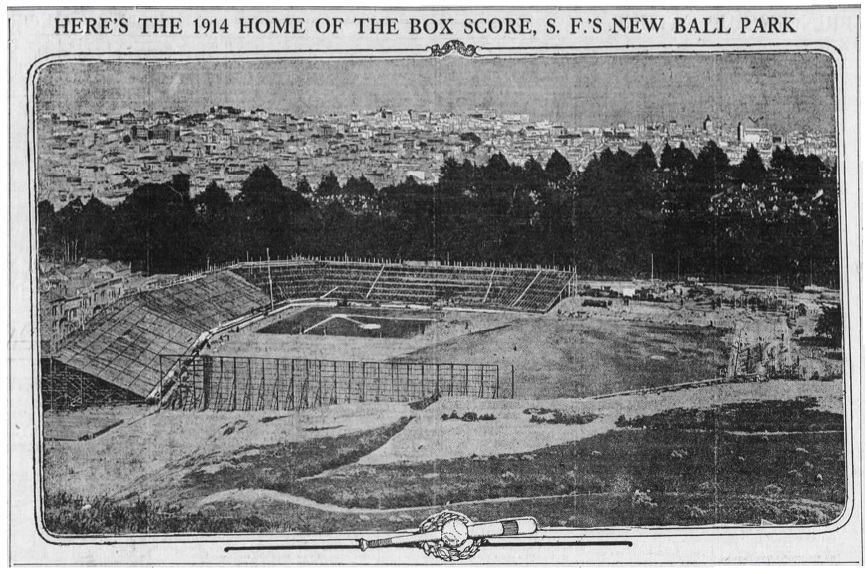
Ewing Field under construction

== History ==
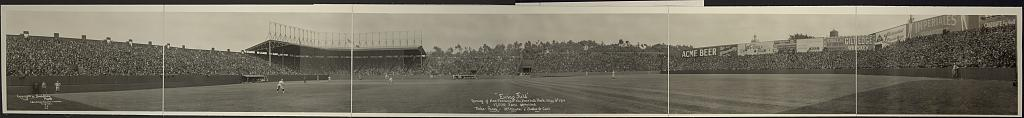
Ewing Field on opening day, May 16, 1914

After several years at Recreation Park, Seals owner J. Cal Ewing was faced with some complex legal issues concerned with his ownership and his rental of Recreation Park. He decided to build a new ballpark in a part of the city that at the time had many cemeteries.

The field dimensions were reported as 340 ft (100 m) left field line; 400 ft (120 m) center field; and 356 ft (109 m) right field line.[San Francisco Chronicle, March 22, 1914, p.61]

After one season at the new park, and after enduring many complaints about the cold, windy, foggy weather at Ewing Field, Ewing sold the team and the ballpark to Henry and Clarence Berry, who moved the club back to Recreation Park.

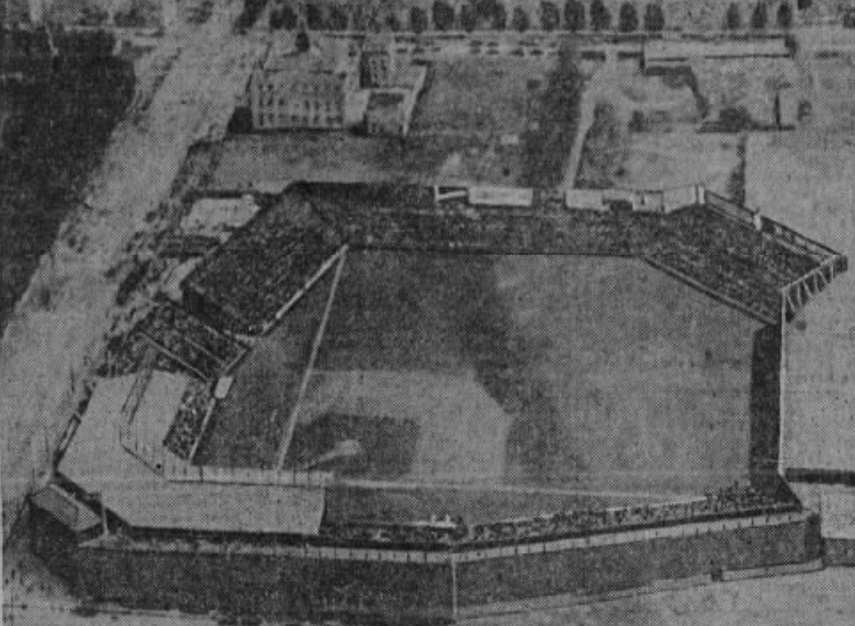
Ewing Field in May, 1914

The ballpark was subsequently used by local amateurs for football, soccer, rugby, and using a portable wooden ring that was stored under the stands, for boxing. During a game on June 5, 1926, the wooden structure caught fire from a cigarette, and soon burned down. Windblown embers set fire to approximately 100 houses. With the ballpark fire raging out of control, the firemen concentrated their efforts on protecting the rest of the neighborhood, including the Presentation Convent behind the left field corner of the ballpark. The left field bleachers avoided the fire due to a gap between them and the main grandstand.

The field continued to be used for football, with spectators using the bleachers. It also served as the venue for the San Francisco State Gators football, from 1931 until 1935. It was demolished in 1938 to construct a housing development called Ewing Terrace. The internal looping street is also called Ewing Terrace.
