= Oakland Oaks (PCL) =

Minor league baseball team in Oakland, California (1903-1955)

- 1903–1955; Oakland, California
Team logo
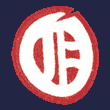
Cap insignia

Minor league affiliations
- Previous classes: Open (1952–1955); Triple-A (1946–1951); Double-A (1912–1945); Single-A (1903–1911)
- League: Pacific Coast League (1903–1940 and 1942–1955); California League (1901 and 1941)

Major league affiliations
- Previous teams: New York Yankees (1935–1937)

Minor league titles
- League titles: 1912, 1927, 1948, 1950, 1954

Team data
- Previous names: Oakland Oaks (1903–1955)
- Previous parks: Oaks Park (1913–1955); Freeman's Park (1903–1911)

The Oakland Oaks were a minor league baseball team in Oakland, California, that played in the Pacific Coast League from 1903 through 1955, after which the club transferred to Vancouver, British Columbia. The team was named for the city and used the oak tree and the acorn as its symbols.

== Team history ==
=== Early years and first pennant (1903–1912) ===
The Oaks were one of the six founding teams of the Single-A Pacific Coast League in 1903. It started as a six-team league, with the others being the Los Angeles Angels, Portland Browns, Sacramento Senators, San Francisco Seals, and Seattle Siwashes.

In their first season, the team finished last in the league, with a 89-126 record. They recovered the next year to earn their first winning record, 116-109, but quickly fell back down the standings, and had five consecutive losing seasons. They won their first PCL pennant in 1912, edging out the Vernon Tigers by a single game. This was also the PCL's first season as a Double-A minor league.

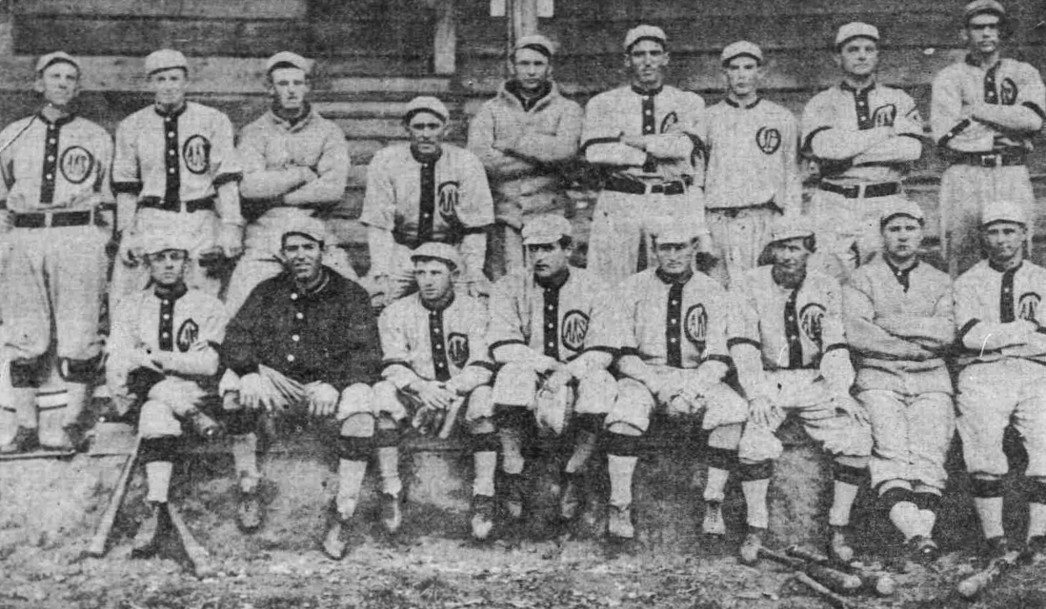
The 1911 Oakland Oaks

During these early years, the Oaks (or "Acorns" as they were also called) played their home games at Freeman's Park at 59th Street and San Pablo Avenue near the border of Oakland and Emeryville and across San Francisco Bay at Recreation Park in San Francisco.

=== Settling in at Oaks Park (1913–1940) ===
After the 1912 season, the Oaks opened their new stadium, named Oakland Ball Park (or simply Oaks Park) though it was located in the neighboring city of Emeryville at San Pablo and Park Avenues. Despite winning the PCL the year before, the 1913 Oaks finished last in the league, and would spend almost a decade before their next winning season, in 1921.

In 1916, a struggling Oaks team made history by (inadvertently) breaking the professional baseball color line, as Jimmy Claxton pitched in both ends of a double-header on May 28, 1916. He was introduced to the team as an American Indian, but once the team discovered that his ancestry was both Native American and African, he was fired. The Oaks were owned by PCL founding father J. Cal Ewing from 1903 until the 1920s. Ewing also owned the San Francisco Seals, which allowed the clubs to share their ballparks at various times with no problem, but the leaders of Organized Baseball eventually made Ewing choose one or the other, and he divested his interests in the Oakland club.

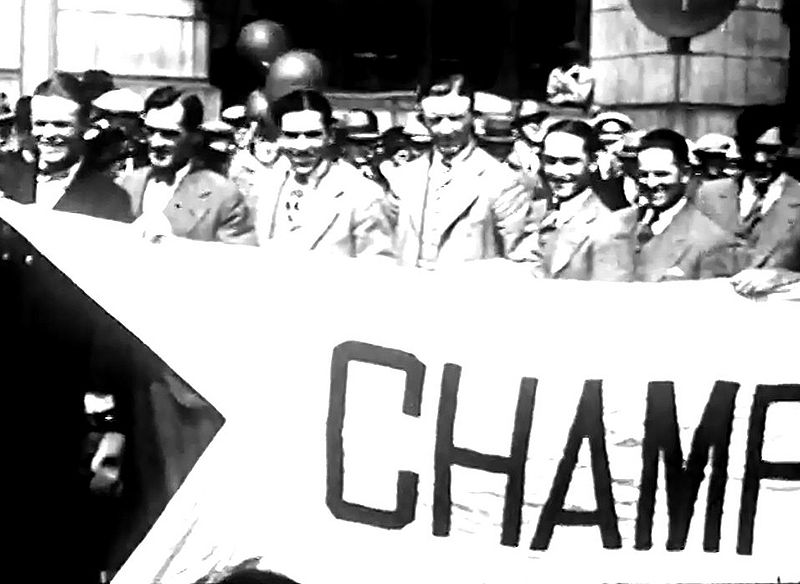
The 1927 Oakland Oaks holding a PCL championship banner

In 1927, the Oaks won their second PCL pennant, and their first at Oaks Park, finishing 120–75 (.615), 14 1/2 games over the runner-up Seals. As with their first pennant, their pennant-winning season was followed with a losing season in 1928.

Until 1935, the Oaks did not have an affiliation with a major league team. Most of the PCL teams were unaffiliated at that time. For the 1935, 1936, and 1937 seasons, they were an affiliate of the New York Yankees. The Oaks remained unaffiliated until they left Oakland ahead of the 1956 season.

=== The war years and post-war success (1941–1954) ===
The PCL continued operations throughout World War II, and prospered in the post-war years. Due to the league's long season and decent pay, it attracted many good players, and in 1945 even voted to become a major league alongside the American and National Leagues. Though the major leagues did not accept the PCL into their ranks, the PCL did get promoted to a Triple-A league starting in 1946, the highest level of minor league play. In 1947, the PCL named the Oaks as named as one of four PCL teams to be considered for promotion into the AL and NL, although this did not come to pass. In 1952, the PCL was promoted again, to a new "Open" league classification, a hybrid position between minor and major league.

The Oaks underwent a change in ownership during the war. In 1943, a controlling interest in the Oaks was purchased by C. L. "Brick" Laws and Joe Blumenfeld, who operated the team for its remaining seasons. In 1946, Laws hired Casey Stengel, the former manager of the Brooklyn Dodgers and Boston Braves of the National League, to manage the Oaks. Attendance and interest in the Oaks grew, including the return of baseball cards featuring the Oaks' players. It was in Oakland that Stengel developed his talent for platooning, which later served him as manager of the New York Yankees. He responded with second and fourth-place finishes, before the club won its most celebrated pennant in 1948.

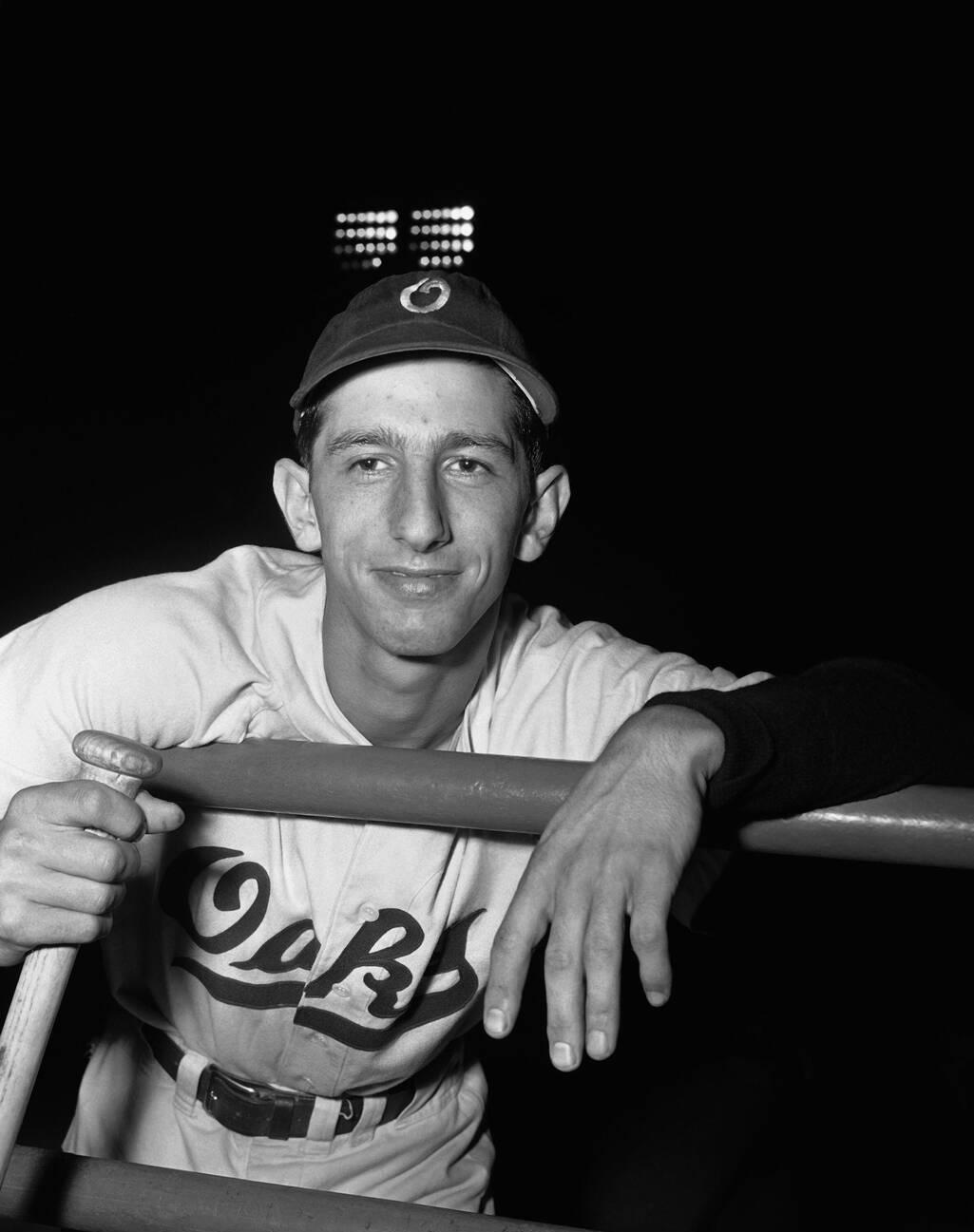
Future major leaguer Billy Martin in 1949, his last season with the Oaks before being acquired by the New York Yankees

The 1948 team was nicknamed the "Nine Old Men" in that many of the star players were older veterans, including Ernie Lombardi, Billy Raimondi, Cookie Lavagetto, Nick Etten and Catfish Metkovich. There were younger players on the team as well, including rookie second baseman Billy Martin. Rooming with Martin and playing shortstop was Artie Wilson, the first black player on the Oaks since Jimmy Claxton was fired in 1916. Wilson won the PCL batting title with a .348 average and also led in stolen bases with 47. In 1950, he led the PCL in runs with 168 and hits with 264, helping the Oaks to the 1950 PCL championship.

Stengel's success with the Oaks did not go unnoticed, and he became manager of the Yankees in 1949. Stengel was replaced by Chuck Dressen, who led the Oaks to a second-place finish in 1949 and the PCL pennant in 1950. Again, the Oaks' manager's success resulted in a promotion to the major leagues, with Dressen hired to manage the Dodgers in 1951. Former New York Giants star Mel Ott was hired as his replacement. Ott led the Oaks to an 80–88 record in 1951 (seventh place) and a 104–76 mark in 1952 (second place).

Augie Galan replaced Ott as the Oaks' skipper in 1953, and the team stumbled to a 77–103 record and seventh place in the PCL.

The next season, Chuck Dressen returned as Oaks manager after three seasons in charge of the Dodgers in Brooklyn. The Acorns finished third with an 85–82 record under Dressen, but won the postseason series, including sweeping their cross-bay rivals, the San Francisco Seals, 3-0 in the finals. This would end up being their final PCL pennant.

=== The final year in Oakland (1955) ===
Despite the team's success, attendance at Oaks Park had dropped dramatically. After Laws bought the team, Oaks Park was expanded to fit 12,500 fans. In that 1947 season, the average attendance was more than 6,000 spectators per game. By 1953, attendance had cratered to a mere only 1,500 per game. Even in the championship season of 1954, attendance only rebounded to 2,400 per game. The Oaks were not the only team suffering; nationally televised major league games contributed to the decline of the PCL as a whole, as West Coast fans were no longer limited to watching PCL games for high-quality baseball. Changes in the league's schedule and Oaks Park's age further diminished interest in attending the games.

The Oaks were also victims of their 1954 success. Winning the championship led to Dressen getting another chance at managing at the major-league level, taking over the Washington Senators' dugout for the 1955 season. San Francisco Seals legend Lefty O'Doul took over in Oakland. Under O'Doul, the Oaks finished seventh (77–95) in 1955, and their attendance was the worst of the eight-team league. Owner Laws felt he had no other choice but to move the team. When officials of Vancouver, British Columbia made him an offer, Laws moved the Oaks to Vancouver, where they were renamed the Vancouver Mounties. The Mounties would eventually fold in 1963.

== Legacy ==
Oaks Park was demolished in 1957, replaced by a Pepsi-Cola bottling plant. Presently, the site is the headquarters of Pixar Animation Studios. The only thing left in the area to suggest that baseball was ever played at Park and San Pablo Avenues is a cardroom and restaurant across the street, appropriately named the Oaks Club. There is also a plaque commemorating the Oaks on a bench on Park Avenue, near where fans entered the park.

On October 18, 1967, twelve years after the Oaks played their last game in Emeryville, the American League owners gave Kansas City Athletics president Charles O. Finley permission to move the Athletics to Oakland for the 1968 season. The A's moved to Sacramento in 2025, as part of their eventual move to Las Vegas.

In 2024, ahead of the A's relocation, the Oakland Ballers began play in the Pioneer League, an independent minor league. The Ballers, often shortened to the B's as a play on the Athletics' nickname of the A's, won the Pioneer League in 2025.

== Notable Oaks players with MLB experience ==
- Buzz Arlett
- George Bamberger
- Charlie Beamon
- Gene Bearden
- Sam Bohne (originally "Sam Cohen")
- Roger Bowman
- Ernie Broglio
- Sam Chapman
- Bill Conroy
- Vince DiMaggio
- Chuck Dressen
- Ed Fernandes
- Augie Galan
- Billy Herman (HOF)
- Jackie Jensen
- Spider Jorgensen
- Harry Krause
- Ray Kremer
- Cookie Lavagetto
- Thornton Lee
- Ernie Lombardi (HOF)
- Billy Martin
- Hersh Martin
- Catfish Metkovich
- Walter Moser
- Joe Gordon (HOF)
- Johnny Ostrowski
- Mel Ott (HOF)
- Jackie Price
- Earl Rapp
- Jimmie Reese
- Bill Rigney
- Neill Sheridan
- Floyd Speer
- Casey Stengel (HOF)
- Jim Tobin
- Artie Wilson
- Chuck Workman
- Roy Zimmerman

== Affiliations ==
The Oaks were independent of farm systems for most of their existence; they were affiliated with the following major league teams:

Year	Affiliation(s)
1935–37	New York Yankees

== Tributes ==
The Oakland Athletics have worn Oaks uniforms on occasion in a "1950s throwback night" promotion.

== See also ==
- List of Oakland Oaks no-hitters
