= San Francisco Seals (PCL) =

- 1903–1957; San Francisco, California

Team logo	Cap insignia

Minor league affiliations
- Previous classes: Open (1952–1957); Triple-A (1946–1951); Double-A (1908–1945); A (1903–1907)
- League: Pacific Coast League (1903–1957)

Major league affiliations
- Previous teams: Boston Red Sox (1956–1957); New York Yankees (1951); Brooklyn Dodgers (1942); New York Giants (1936)

Minor league titles
- League titles: 1909, 1915, 1917, 1922, 1923, 1925, 1928, 1931, 1935, 1943, 1944, 1945, 1946, 1957

Team data
- Previous names: San Francisco Seals (1903–1957)
- Previous parks: Seals Stadium (1931–1957); Ewing Field (1914); Recreation Park (1903–1913, 1915–1930)

The San Francisco Seals were a Minor League Baseball team in San Francisco, California, that played in the Pacific Coast League from 1903 until 1957 before transferring to Phoenix, Arizona. The organization was named for the abundant California sea lion and harbor seal populations in the Bay Area. The 1909, 1922, 1925, and 1928 Seals were recognized as being among the 100 greatest minor league teams of all time.

== Early history ==
Along with the Los Angeles Angels, Portland Beavers, Oakland Oaks, Sacramento Solons, and Seattle Indians, the Seals were charter members of the Pacific Coast League, which was founded in 1903. The team played their home games at Recreation Park at Harrison and 8th Streets until it was destroyed in the 1906 San Francisco earthquake.

The mild climate of the west coast allowed the PCL to play a much longer season than the major leagues and the other eastern professional baseball leagues. Seasons often ran 200 games or more, especially in the early years. In the 1905 season, the Seals set the all-time PCL record by playing 230 games (Pacific Coast Baseball League Record Book 1903–1969, compiled by William J. Weiss, League Statistician; published by the PCL, 1969; p. 30).

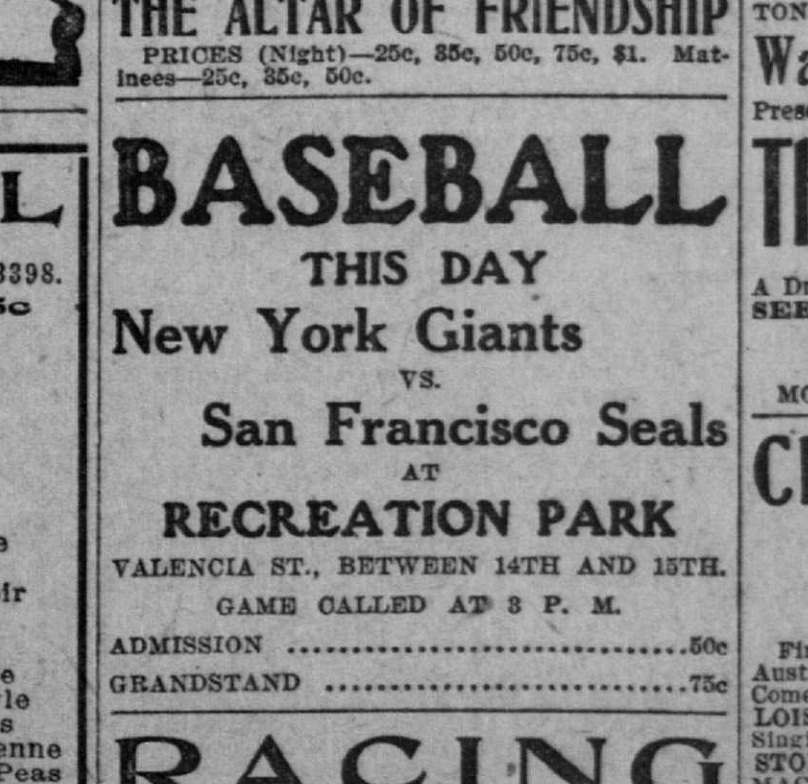
1907 advertisement for game at Valencia Street Recreation Park stadium

The Seals finished the 1906 season playing home games at Freeman's Park in Oakland. A new Recreation Park was constructed at 14th and Valencia Streets for the 1907 season. The Seals won their first PCL pennant in 1909, finishing 13 1/2 games over the runner-up Portland Beavers. They won flags also in 1915, 1917, 1922, 1923 and 1925.

During the 1914 season, the Sacramento Solons were moved to San Francisco, where they finished out the season playing as the San Francisco Missions, representing the city's Mission District. That same year, the Seals moved across town to play their inaugural and only season at foggy Ewing Field. The idea of a second team in San Francisco remained alive and, after the 1925 season, the Vernon Tigers were purchased by a group headed by San Francisco businessman Herbert Fleishhacker and moved to San Francisco and renamed the Mission Reds or simply the "Missions", again representing the Mission District as this team played their games five blocks from Mission San Francisco de Asís. From 1926 through 1930, they played their home games at Recreation Park, playing at home while the Seals were on the road.

In 1918, financially strapped owner Henry Berry put the San Francisco Seals up for sale and Charles H. Strub, George Alfred (Alfie) Putnam and Charles H. Graham each acquired a one-third share in the team.

In 1931, the Seals moved to their own park, Seals Stadium, an 18,600-seat facility located at 16th and Bryant Streets. Seals Stadium was unusual in that it boasted three clubhouses: one for the visitors, one for the Seals, and one for the Missions, who moved there with the Seals and were the Seals' tenants from 1931 through 1937, after which the team moved back to Los Angeles to become the Hollywood Stars in 1938.

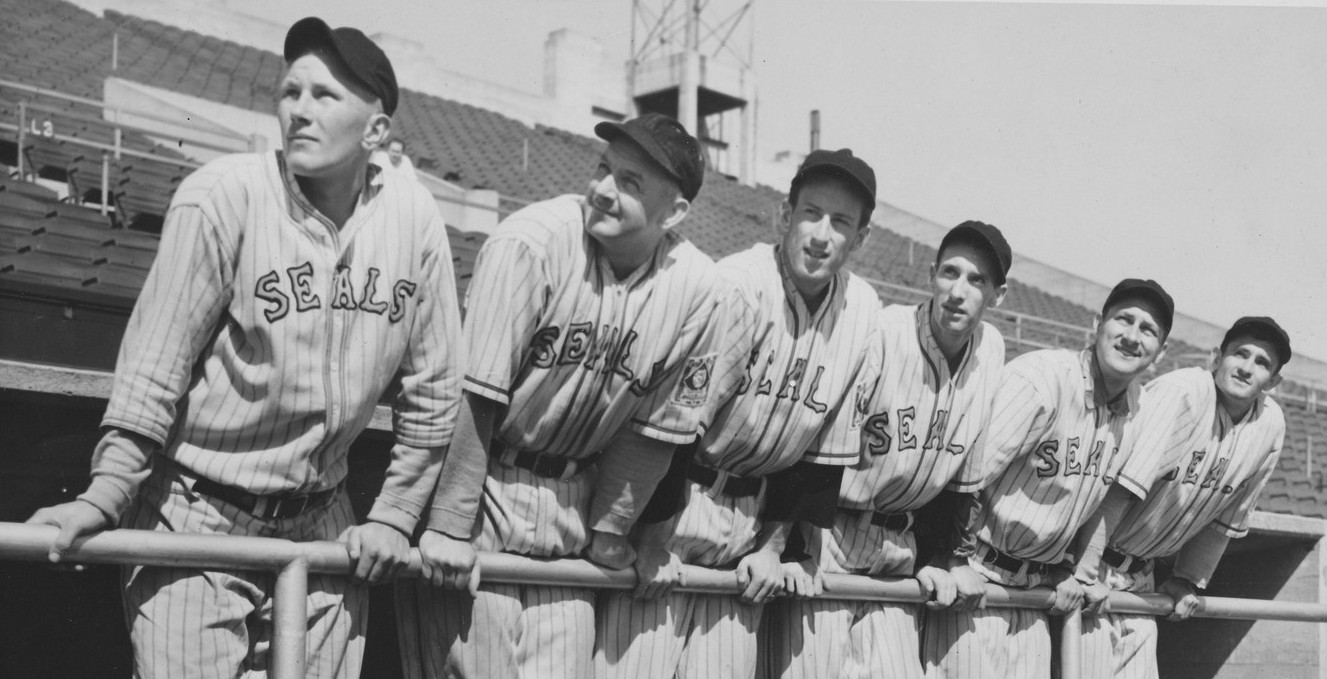
1940 San Francisco Seals pitchers

There were three breweries on the adjoining northwest corners of Seals Stadium, which included Hamm's, Budweiser and Lucky Lager.

The Seals celebrated their inaugural year in Seals Stadium by winning the PCL pennant in 1931. The following year, Seals outfielder Vince DiMaggio arranged a tryout for his younger brother Joe. In 1933, Joe DiMaggio hit safely in 61 straight games, a harbinger of his 56-game hitting streak for the New York Yankees in 1941. The team won the pennant again in 1935.

== Change of control ==
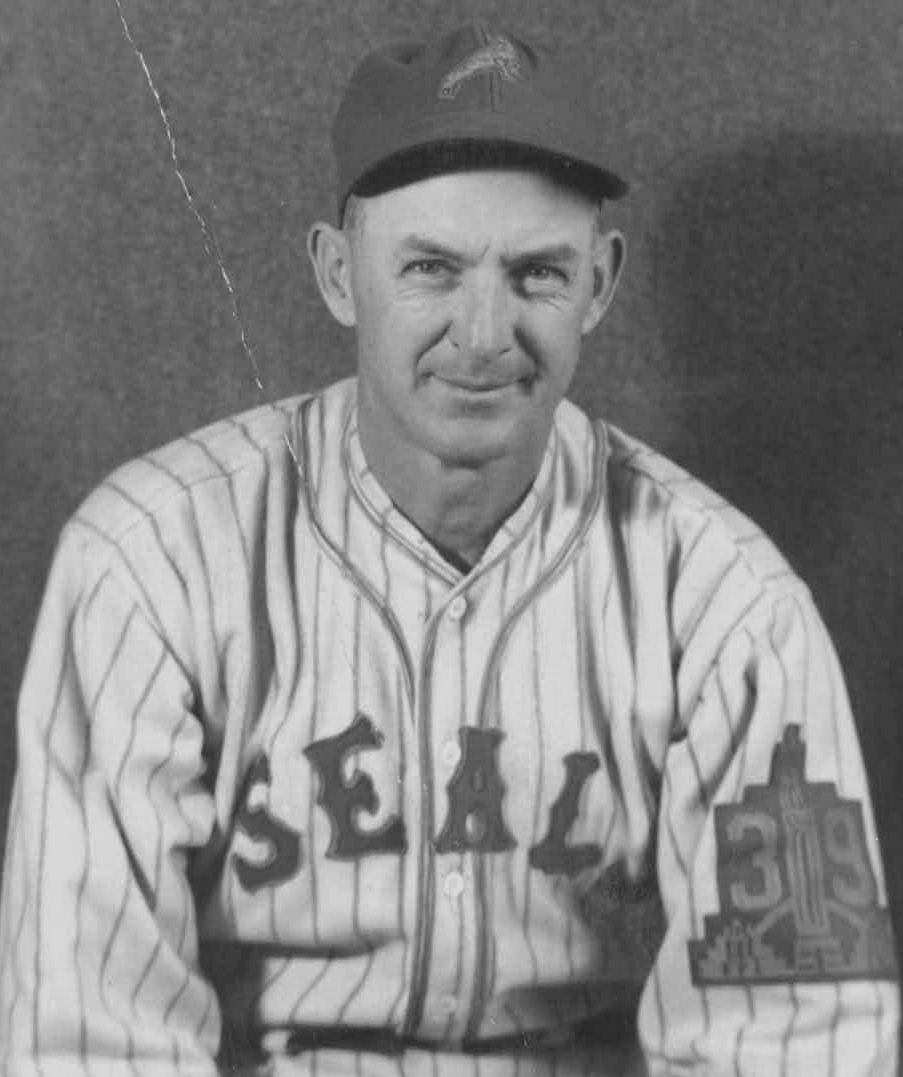
Pitcher Sam Gibson in a Seals uniform, c. 1939

In 1945, a controlling interest in the team was purchased by businessman Paul Fagan, with the stated intention of bringing Major League Baseball to the west coast by having the Pacific Coast League becoming the nation's third major league. He spent thousands of dollars upgrading Seals Stadium to perceived major league standards. He hired former major league player Lefty O'Doul, a native San Franciscan and fan favorite, as manager. Though the Seals won the pennant in 1946, subsequent teams under Fagan's watch did not fare as well, typically finishing in the second division. Rival clubs did not buy into Fagan's major league ambitions. Rather, they established working agreements with major league teams, and fared better than did the independent Seals.

In 1949 the Seals, including O'Doul, made an exhibition tour to post war Japan. O'Doul stated the crowds were sad and not enthusitastic; the oppostite of what they were when he was there 1931 and 1934. A Japanese American Army major ordered the US and Japan flags to be flown together at the same height at the first exhibition game at Kōrakuen Stadium on October 15, 1949. The Japanese became very emotional and exhibition and their pre-war enthusiasm for baseball was reignited.

Fagan gave up his aspirations and sold his interest in the Seals, who became an affiliate of the Boston Red Sox. After their Bay Area rival, the Oakland Oaks, moved to Vancouver after the 1955 season, the Seals won their last PCL pennant in 1957, which proved to be their final season. Late in that season, the New York Giants announced their move to San Francisco for the 1958 season, and the Seals were forced to relocate.

1940 cap logo

As part of the Giants' transfer to San Francisco, the Seals became its top affiliate after a swap on October 15, 1957, in which the Minneapolis Millers joined the Red Sox organization. They moved to Phoenix, Arizona for the 1958 season and were renamed the Phoenix Giants. The franchise then moved to Tacoma, Washington, where they played from 1960 to 1965, returning to Phoenix for the 1966 season. The team remained in Phoenix–from 1986 onward as the Firebirds–until 1998, when they were displaced by MLB's Arizona Diamondbacks. In a complicated deal, the Firebirds' ownership group bought the Tucson Toros, inheriting the Toros' staff and facilities. After an interim one-year affiliation with the Milwaukee Brewers, the Toros affiliated with the Diamondbacks and changed their name to the Sidewinders. The Giants' affiliation was transferred to the displaced Tucson AAA franchise, which became the Fresno Grizzlies until their reassignment to Low-A. In 2009, the Sidewinders franchise moved to Reno, Nevada. They retained their affiliation with the Arizona Diamondbacks as the Reno Aces, and play their home games at Greater Nevada Field. The Tucson Toros returned under the same ownership as the Sidewinders, but they are not affiliated with a major league club. The new Toros played their home games at Hi Corbett Field, the longtime home of minor league baseball in Tucson, until 2010.

The Giants played their home games at Seals Stadium in 1958 and 1959, moving to Candlestick Park in 1960. Seals Stadium was subsequently torn down to make way for a White Front store. When this chain of stores went out of business, the building stayed empty for some years. It was finally turned into a car dealership and later a Safeway grocery store. The legacy of the Seals lives on in the Giants' mascot Lou Seal, as well as in a statue of the Seals' cartoon mascot (c. 1947) at Oracle Park, and with a marker on the 16th & Bryant sidewalk placed where Seals Stadium home plate stood.

== Rebirth in 1985 ==
The Seals were reborn as a collegiate woodbat team in 1985 by Bay Area high school and college coach as well as former scout Abel Alcantar. Seals Alumni include many current California Junior College, Division I, and Division II coaches. The Seals played out of Albert Park in San Rafael, CA until 2002, until the historic team moved to Sonoma, CA, and then most recently Alameda, CA where he put together teams at various levels from 8U-18U while continuing the collegiate summer team. The collegiate team played in the Far West League in 2012 and 2013, the Great West League in 2018, and the California Collegiate League in 2019, but has been known for being an independent summer collegiate team that travels more than any summer collegiate team in the nation, simulating the grind of minor league professional baseball. They have made appearances in the Alaska Baseball League, the West Coast League, Canada, and the National Baseball Congress World Series in Wichita, KS.

== Affiliations ==
The Seals were largely independent of major league farm systems except for the following affiliations:

Year	Affiliation(s)
1936; 1945	New York Giants
1942	Brooklyn Dodgers
1951	New York Yankees
1956–57	Boston Red Sox

== Notable alumni ==
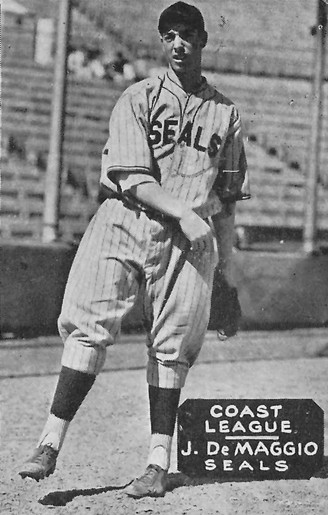
A baseball card of Joe DiMaggio during his tenure with the San Francisco Seals, c. 1933–36

- Earl Averill, Major League Baseball outfielder, Hall of Fame
- Frank Bodie, Major League Baseball outfielder
- Sam Bohne (originally "Sam Cohen"; 1896–1977), Major League Baseball infielder
- Syd Cohen, Major League Baseball pitcher
- Frank Crosetti, Major League Baseball infielder
- Dominic DiMaggio, Major League Baseball outfielder
- Joe DiMaggio, Major League Baseball outfielder, Hall of Fame
- Vince DiMaggio, Major League Baseball outfielder
- Babe Ellison, MLB player and member of Pacific Coast League Hall of Fame
- Ferris Fain, Major League Baseball Infielder, 2-time American League batting champion
- Harry Feldman, Major League Baseball pitcher
- Vernon "Lefty" Gomez, Major League Baseball pitcher, Hall of Fame
- Smead Jolley, Major League Baseball outfielder
- Frank Malzone, Major League third baseman and 8 time MLB All Star
- Jack Mealey (born 1899), catcher, manager in minor leagues and president of Sooner State League
- Lefty O'Doul, Major League Baseball outfielder; Seals manager, Japanese Baseball Hall of Fame, Bay Area Sports Hall of Fame
- Albie Pearson, Major League Baseball outfielder, 1958 AL Rookie of the Year, 1963 All-Star
- Babe Pinelli, Major League Baseball infielder and umpire
- Gus Suhr, Major League Baseball outfielder
- Paul Waner, Major League Baseball outfielder, Hall of Fame
- George "Buck" Weaver, Major League Baseball infielder, Member of the 1919 Chicago "Black Sox"
- Gene Woodling, Major League Baseball outfielder

== See also ==
- List of San Francisco Seals no-hitters

Preceded by Louisville Colonels (Triple-A)	Boston Red Sox; Open Classification affiliate 1956–1957	Succeeded by Minneapolis Millers (Triple-A)
