= Southern California League =

Minor league baseball league

- Classification: Independent (1886, 1899–1900); Class D (1913)
- Sport: Minor League Baseball
- First season: 1886
- Folded: July 13, 1913
- President: Jay Davidson (1913)
- No. of teams: 6
- Country: United States of America
- Most titles: 1 San Bernardino Grays (1899); San Diego Bears (1913)
- Related competitions: Southern California Trolley League

The Southern California League was a minor league baseball league that played in the 1886, 1899, 1900 and 1913 seasons. The Class D level four–team Southern California League consisted of franchises based in California. The Southern California League permanently folded during the 1913 season.

== History ==
An independent league called the Southern California League played in the 1886, 1899 and 1900 seasons. The 1886 teams are unknown. The 1899 teams were the Los Angeles Angelenos, Los Angeles Merchants, San Bernardino Grays and San Diego Fullers. The San Bernardino Grays won the 1899 league championship. The 1900 teams were Azusa, Los Angeles, Los Angeles-Pacific and San Diego. No official league standings are known of the 1896 and 1900 seasons.

The Southern California League was formed for the 1913 season as a four–team Class D minor league under the direction of league president Jay Davidson. The Southern California League began play in the 1913 season hosting franchises from Long Beach, California (Long Beach Beachcombers), Pasadena, California (Pasadena Millionaires), San Bernardino, California (San Bernardino Kittens) and San Diego, California (San Diego Bears).

The San Bernardino Kittens were owned by player/owner and namesake, Kitty Brashear.

The Southern California League officially began play on April 22, 1913. San Bernardino had a home opener crowd of 1,000 at Urbita Springs Park, where Mayor Joseph Bright threw out the ceremonial first pitch before San Bernardino defeated Long Beach 12–4 and begin a seven–game winning streak to start the season. Pasadena had attendance of 1,600 at their home opener. The Southern California League had scheduled Sunday double headers, with the first game being scheduled on Sunday morning. This led to disputes with local clergy in the host locales and schedules were rearranged. Teams began to struggle financially and president Jay Davidson suggested that each team issue stock.

In 1913, Homer Miller and Blount, pitching for the Long Beach Beachcombers, threw consecutive Southern California League no-hitters against the San Diego Bears.

The league was scheduled in a split–season format, with champions in each half of the season. Pasadena had a 15–38 record when the franchise moved to Santa Barbara on June 13, 1913 to become the Santa Barbara Barbareans. The San Diego Bears won the first half of the season. In the second half, the Santa Barbara Barbareans were leading the second half when the Southern California League permanently disbanded on July 23, 1913. The San Diego Bears (56–33) had the best overall record, followed by the San Bernardino Kittens (48–38), Long Beach Beachcombers (43–46) and Pasadena Millionaires/Santa Barbara Barbareans (27–57). During the season, the San Diego Bears had a 20–game winning streak that ended on the final day of league play.

== Southern California League teams ==
| Team name | City represented | Ballpark | Year active |
|---|---|---|---|
| Long Beach Beachcombers | Long Beach, California | Connor Park | 1913 |
| Los Angeles Angelenos 1899; Los Angeles Merchants 1899 | Los Angeles, California | Unknown | 1899 |
| Pasadena Millionaires | Pasadena, California | Unknown | 1913 |
| Santa Barbara Barbareans | Santa Barbara, California | Unknown | 1913 |
| San Bernardino Grays 1899; San Bernardino Kittens 1913 | San Bernardino, California | Urbita Springs Park | 1899, 1913 |
| San Diego Fullers 1899; San Diego Bears 1913 | San Diego, California | League Park/Connor Park | 1899, 1913 |

== Standings & statistics ==
1899 Southern California League

| Team standings | W | L | PCT | GB | Managers |
|---|---|---|---|---|---|
| San Bernardino Grays | 19 | 9 | .679 | – | George Cobb / Seth Hart |
| San Diego Fullers | 18 | 10 | .643 | 1 | J.M. Dodge / Patterson Spriggs |
| Los Angeles Angelenos | 10 | 18 | .357 | 9 | James Wooley / Charles Thomas |
| Los Angeles Merchants | 9 | 19 | .321 | 10 | Gil Mead / Frank Gridley |

Playoffs: None were held

Player statistics
| Player | Team | Stat | Tot | Player | Team | Stat | Tot |
|---|---|---|---|---|---|---|---|
| Elmer Gibbs | San Diego | BA | .418 | Mun Thurman | San Bernardino | W | 13 |
| Sandy Barclay | San Diego | Runs | 43 | Kid Cortad | San Diego | SO | 105 |
| Elmer Gibbs | San Diego | Hits | 51 | Mun Thurman | San Bernardino | PCT | .765 13–4 |
| Elmer Gibbs | San Diego | HR | 4 | | | | |
| Babe Whaling | San Bernardino/ Los Angeles | HR | 4 | | | | |
| Tom Works | San Diego | HR | 4 | | | | |

1913 Southern California League

| Team standings | W | L | PCT | GB | Managers |
|---|---|---|---|---|---|
| San Diego Bears | 56 | 33 | .629 | – | Spencer Abbott / Dick Cooley |
| San Bernardino Kittens | 48 | 38 | .550 | 6½ | Ed Householder / Kitty Brashear |
| Long Beach Beachcombers | 43 | 46 | .483 | 9½ | Bull Durham / Harry G. Connor / Jesse Stovall |
| Pasadena Millionaires / Santa Barbara Barbareans | 27 | 57 | .385 | 26½ | John Schuster / Bull Durham / Spencer Abbott |

Pasadena (15–38) moved to Santa Barbara June 13
League folded July 23

== Notable alumni ==
- Spencer Abbott (1913)
- Kitty Brashear (1913)
- George Cobb (1899)
- Bull Durham (1913)
- Ed Householder (1913)
- Jesse Stovall (1913)
