= Albert Robles =

American politician

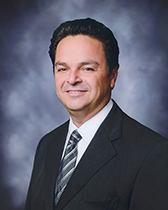
- Robles in 2017

Mayor of Carson, California
- In office 2015–2020
- Preceded by: Jim Dear
- Succeeded by: Lula Davis-Holmes

Member of the Carson City Council
- In office 2013–2015
- Succeeded by: Jawane Hilton

Member of the Water Replenishment District of Southern California for the 5th Division
- In office 1992–2018
- Succeeded by: Vera Robles DeWitt

Personal details
- Born: 1969 (age 56–57)
- Party: Democratic Party
- Education: University of Colorado Boulder; UC Berkeley School of Law; University of Southern California

Albert Robles is an American politician of the Democratic Party who has served as a local elected official 1992-2020 representing Carson, California, culminating as mayor of the city 2015-2020. When first elected in 1992 he was California's youngest person to hold public office. Prior to his appointment as mayor, he served on the Carson City Council. Robles has also served the Water Replenishment District of Southern California, at times concurrently with his service on the Carson city council. The concurrent service has been the subject of a legal challenge.

== Biography ==
Robles was born in the Mexican state of Sonora in 1969, but grew up in the city Carson, CA.

== Education ==
Robles earned a dual Bachelors from the University of Colorado at Boulder, a Juris Doctor degree from the UC Berkeley School of Law and a master's degree from the University of Southern California, where he was a USC Merit Scholarship recipient.

== Career ==
Robles was first elected to public office in 1992 when he was 23 years old to the Water Replenishment District of Southern California Board of Directors, representing Division 5. In 1992 he was the youngest elected official in California. He is the youngest Director elected to the WRD board and has been re-elected to seven terms, most recently in 2016. In 2013, he was elected to the Carson City Council. He became mayor in 2015 to fill a vacancy created by the resignation of Mayor Jim Dear. In 2016, Carson voters re-elected Robles, who received 55.2 percent of the vote over former Mayor Dear.

Robles was a strong supporter for an NFL stadium to be built in Carson. During one press conference Robles wore a mashup jersey featuring the logos for both the Chargers and the Raiders.

Robles represented former South Gate treasurer Albert T. Robles (no relation) during the appeal of the latter's earlier 2004 corruption conviction.

=== 2006 Vernon city elections ===
Robles was involved in the controversial 2006 elections in Vernon, California, the first elections held in that city since 1980. Robles represented the challengers in the city council election who moved into an abandoned building in the city so they could register to vote. The Vernon city clerk accused Albert T. Robles of being involved in the scheme. A court upheld the candidates' right to run in the election. Afterwards, Leonis C. Malburg, the mayor of Vernon, was indicted and eventually convicted of conspiracy, perjury, and voter fraud.

=== Campaign for Los Angeles County District Attorney ===
In 2008, Robles ran against Steve Cooley in the election for Los Angeles County District Attorney, receiving 20% of the vote coming in second among three candidates. During the campaign, Robles faced misdemeanor charges filed against him by Cooley's office in November 2007. Robles was charged with printing a pair of political mailers without a return address and expending more than $100 cash in a political campaign. Robles accused Cooley of direct involvement in the charges brought against him because of a personal vendetta and to effect outcome of the election. Cooley denied those allegations. Although Robles lost to Cooley in June 2008, a jury found Robles not guilty of all charges after deliberating for only twenty (20) minutes and he was re-elected in November 2008 to his seat on the Water Replenishment board.

== Controversies ==
Robles faced multiple campaign finance violations for failing to submit documents during the 2012 and 2016 elections. He initially had been ordered to pay at least $85,000 in fines, and agreed to pay $12,000 to settle the violations.

Robles was also the subject of a sexual harassment suit brought by another Water Replenishment District director after losing a re-election campaign for the position in 2014. The former appointed director was the daughter of former CA Lieutenant Governor, Congressman, and Assemblyman Mervyn Dymally, but Robles denied the allegation. The judge in the case dismissed the unverified action with prejudice. In 2016, Los Angeles County prosecutors sued Robles to prevent him from keeping his seat on the Water Replenishment Board, claiming that a person cannot serve as mayor (or city council member) and water board member at the same time.

Robles is the subject of a separate probe by county prosecutors over his city of residence. The Los Angeles Times reported that Robles is actually living in the Adams-Normandie neighborhood of Los Angeles, but he is claiming he resides at his parents’ home in Carson.

Robles was also facing a state ethics inquiry after "failing to submit state-required disclosure statements for his political campaign finances and personal economic interests for both his elected jobs." This also became part of the $12,000 settlement.

Robles was scrutinized due to his alleged intent for potential pension spiking.
