= Pasadena Silk Sox =

- 1910; (1910, 1913); Pasadena, California

Minor league affiliations
- Class: Class D (1910, 1913)
- League: Southern California Trolley League (1910); Southern California League (1913)

Major league affiliations
- Team: None

Minor league titles
- League titles (0): None

Team data
- Name: Pasadena Silk Sox (1910); Pasadena Millionaires (1913); Santa Barbara Barbaraeans (1913)
- Ballpark: Brookside Park* (1910, 1913)

The Pasadena Silk Sox were a short–lived minor league baseball team based in Pasadena, California in 1910. Pasadena teams played as members of the Class D level Southern California Trolley League in 1910 and the 1913 Southern California League, with both teams having short tenures of play. The two teams have been the only minor league teams based in Pasadena.

== History ==
Pasadena, California first gained a minor league baseball team in 1910. The Pasadena Silk Sox were founding members of the 1910 Class D level Southern California Trolley League. Pasadena fielded a franchise when the league formed for the 1910 season as a six–team minor league under the direction of league president Jim McCormick. The 1910 Southern California Trolley League franchises from Long Beach, California (Long Beach Clothiers), Los Angeles, California (Los Angeles McCormicks and Los Angeles Maiers), Redondo Beach, California (Redondo Beach Wharf Rats) and Santa Ana, California (Santa Ana Walnut Growers) joined Pasadena in league play.

The league's "Trolley" moniker was in reference to all the league franchises, Pasadena included, being located in the greater Los Angeles area, where the league member ballparks were accessible via trolley.

When the Pasadena and the Southern California Trolley League began play, it was with games scheduled only on Sundays, with play continuing year around. Pasadena and the Southern California Trolley League teams officially began play on April 3, 1910. The Pasadena managers were Joe Judge and Frank Abbott.

The Pasadena Silk Sox and other Southern California Trolley League members struggled financially. On May 3, 1910, the and Pasadena Silk Sox, with a record of 0–4 and the Los Angeles Maiers (1–3) franchises both folded simultaneously. Shortly after, the entire Southern California Trolley League permanently disbanded on June 13, 1910. At the time the league folded, the Redondo Beach Warf Rats (9–2) were in 1st place followed by the Santa Ana Yellow Sox Growers (8–3), Long Beach Clothiers (4–5) and Los Angeles McCormicks (2–7). After the league collapsed, it was reported that league president Jim McCormick organized a league meeting at his pool hall on South Spring Street for the purpose of settling the league's affairs. It was noted that some of the teams hoped to continue play in the future.

In 1913, Pasadena gained another minor league franchise, as the Pasadena Millionaires began play as charter members of the Class D level Southern California League. The Southern California league formed for the 1913 season as a four–team minor league under the direction of league president Jay Davidson. Pasadena joined fellow Southern California League franchises from Long Beach, California (Long Beach Beachcombers), San Bernardino, California (San Bernardino Kittens) and San Diego, California (San Diego Bears) in the new league. The Pasadena adoption of the "Millionaires" moniker corresponds to the "Millionaires Row" area of Pasadena, along South Orange Grove Boulevard.

The Pasadena Millionaires and the Southern California League officially began play on April 22, 1913, under a split–season schedule format. Pasadena had an attendance of 1,600 at their home opener. The Southern California League had scheduled Sunday double headers, with the first of the two games scheduled to be played on Sunday mornings. This led to disputes with local clergy in the host locales and schedules were rearranged as a result. As teams began to struggle financially, league President Jay Davidson suggested that each team issue stock.

On June 13, 1913, the Pasadena Millionaires had a 15–38 record when the Pasadena franchise moved to Santa Barbara, California, where the team became the Santa Barbara Barbareans. The San Diego Bears won the first half of the season. On July 23, 1913, the Southern California League permanently disbanded with the Santa Barbara Barbareans in 1st place in the second half standings. The San Diego Bears (56–33) had the best overall record, followed by the San Bernardino Kittens (48–38), Long Beach Beachcombers (43–46) and Pasadena /Santa Barbara (27–57). John Schuster, Bull Durham and Spencer Abbott managed the Pasadena/Santa Barbara team. Pasadena has not hosted another minor league franchise.

== The ballpark ==
The exact name and location of the ballpark for both Pasadena teams is not directly referenced. In the era, it is known Pasadena baseball was played at Brookside Park in Pasadena, which was in use during the time the Silk Sox and Millionaires teams played. The Chicago Cubs and Chicago White Sox held spring training games at Brookside Park. Today, the main ballpark in Brookside Park is called Jackie Robinson Memorial Field.

== Timeline ==
Year(s)	# Yrs.	Team	Level	League
1910	1	Pasadena Silk Sox	Class D	Southern California League
1913 (1)	1	Pasadena Millionaires	Class D	Southern California Trolley League
1913(2)	1	Santa Barbara Barbareans	Class D	Southern California Trolley League

== Year–by–year records ==
Year	Record	Finish	Manager	Notes
1910	0–4	NA	Joe Judge / Frank Abbott	Team disbanded May 3
1913	27–57	4th	John Schuster / Spencer Abbott	Pasadena (15–38) moved to Santa Barbara June 13

== Notable alumni ==
- Spencer Abbott (1913, MGR)
- Bull Durham (1913)
- Joe Judge (1910, MGR)
- Complete player roster information for the 1910 and 1913 Pasadena teams is unknown.
