= Long Beach Beachcombers =

- 1910–1913; (1910, 1913); Long Beach, California

Minor league affiliations
- Class: Class D (1910, 1913)
- League: Southern California Trolley League (1910); Southern California League (1913)

Major league affiliations
- Team: None

Minor league titles
- League titles (0): None

Team data
- Name: Long Beach Clothiers (1910); Long Beach Beachcombers (1913)
- Ballpark: Belmont Park Grounds (1910); Connor Park (1913)

The Long Beach Beachcombers was the final moniker of the minor league baseball teams based in Long Beach, California in 1910 and 1913. Long Beach teams played as members of the Class D level Southern California Trolley League in 1910 and the Southern California League in 1913.

== History ==
Minor League baseball was first hosted in Long Beach, California in 1910. The Long Beach Clothiers became founding members of the short-lived Class D level Southern California Trolley League. Long Beach fielded a franchise when the league formed for the 1910 season as a six–team minor league, headed by league president Jim McCormick.

The 1910 Southern California Trolley League consisted of franchises from Long Beach, California (Long Beach Clothiers), Los Angeles, California (Los Angeles McCormicks and Los Angeles Maiers), Pasadena, California (Pasadena Silk Sox), Redondo Beach, California (Redondo Beach Wharf Rats) and Santa Ana, California (Santa Ana Walnut Growers). The league name was in reference to all the league franchises, including Long Beach, being located in the greater Los Angeles area, where the ballparks were accessible via trolley.

The Long Beach Beachcombers and the Southern California Trolley League teams officially began play on April 3, 1910. The Southern California Trolley League began play with games scheduled only on Sundays and play scheduled to continue year around. The Long Beach Clothiers' manager was S.J. Abrams.

The Southern California Trolley League members faced financial difficulties. On May 3, 1910, the Pasadena Silk Sox, with a record of 0–4 and the Los Angeles Maiers (1–3) both folded simultaneously. In a game on May 1, 1910, it was reported that the Los Angeles McCormicks committed 11 errors in a 7–2 loss to Long Beach. The Southern California Trolley League permanently disbanded on June 13, 1910. At the time the league folded, the Redondo Beach Warf Rats (9–2) were in first place followed by the Santa Ana Yellow Sox Growers (8–3), Long Beach Clothiers (4–5) and Los Angeles McCormicks (2–7). After the league folded, it was reported that league president Jim McCormick organized a league meeting at his pool hall on South Spring Street. The purpose of the meeting was to settle the league's remaining affairs. It was noted that some of the teams hoped to continue play in the future.

In 1913, Long Beach gained another minor league franchise when the Long Beach "Beachcombers" began play as charter members of the Class D level Southern California League. The Southern California league formed for the 1913 season as a four–team minor league under the leadership of league president Jay Davidson. Long Beach joined fellow Southern California League franchises from Pasadena, California (Pasadena Millionaires), San Bernardino, California (San Bernardino Kittens) and San Diego, California (San Diego Bears) as the league charter members.

The Long Beach Beachcombers officially began play on April 22, 1913, under a split–season schedule format. Pasadena had attendance of 1,600 at their home opener. The Southern California League had scheduled Sunday double headers, with the first of the two games scheduled to be played on Sunday mornings. This led to disputes with local clergy in the host locales and schedules were rearranged as a result. As teams began to struggle financially, president Jay Davidson suggested that each team issue stock.

As the league played in 1913, the Pasadena Millionaires relocated to Santa Barbara before the league folded. The San Diego Bears won the first half of the season. On July 23, 1913, the Southern California League permanently disbanded with the Santa Barbara Barbareans in first place in the second half standings. The San Diego Bears (56–33) had the best overall record, followed by the San Bernardino Kittens (48–38), Long Beach Beachcombers (43–46) and Pasadena / Santa Barbara (27–57). Harry Connor, Jesse Stovall and Bull Durham managed the Long Beach Beachcombers team.

Long Beach was without minor league baseball until 1995, when the Long Beach Barracudas played as members of the Independent level Western Baseball League. The team won two consecutive league championships playing under manager Jeff Burroughs.

== The ballparks ==
In 1910, the Long Beach Clothiers played home games at the Belmont Park Grounds.

The 1913 Long Beach Beachcombers played home games at Connor Park. The ballpark had a capacity of 400 and was located at Broadway & Parker Avenue, Long Beach, California.

== Timeline ==
Year(s)	# Yrs.	Team	Level	League	Ballpark
1910	1	Long Beach Clothiers	Class D	Southern California League	Belmont Park Grounds
1913	1	Long Beach Beachcombers	Class D	Southern California Trolley League	Connor Park

== Year-by-year records ==
Year	Record	Finish	Manager	Notes
1910	4–5	3rd	S.J. Abrams	League folded June 13
1913	43–46	3rd	Harry Connor / Jesse Stovall / Bull Durham	League folded July 23

== Notable alumni ==
- Bull Durham (1913, MGR)
- Roy Grimes (1913)
- Herb Hall (1913)
- Jesse Stovall (1913, MGR)
- Complete player roster information for the 1910 Long Beach team is unknown.
