= Maier Field =

Maier Field may refer to:

- Maier Park, an early 20th-century baseball field in Los Angeles
- Maier Field, a soccer venue at Sheridan College (Wyoming)
