= 1921 Memphis Chicks season =

1921 Memphis Chicks
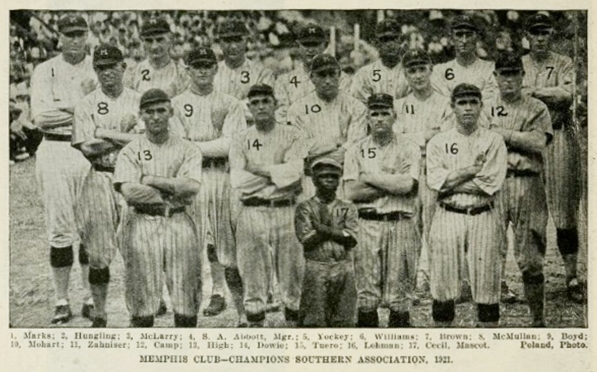
- League: Southern Association
- Ballpark: Russwood Park
- City: Memphis, Tennessee
- Record: 104–49
- League place: 1st
- Managers: Spencer Abbott

The 1921 Memphis Chicks season represented the Memphis Chicks baseball team in the Southern Association and won their third league pennant. The team played its games at Russwood Park. The 1921 Chicks were ranked as the 32nd greatest minor league team of all time. The team's manager was first baseman Spencer Abbott, and the team was led by Cuban pitching ace Oscar Tuero, who led the league in wins. Andy High had a .321 batting average.
