= Santa Ana Walnut Growers =

- 1910–1929; (1910, 1929); Santa Ana, California

Minor league affiliations
- Class: Class D (1910, 1929)
- League: Southern California Trolley League (1910); California State League (1929)

Major league affiliations
- Team: None

Minor league titles
- League titles (0): None

Team data
- Name: Santa Ana Walnut Growers (1910); Santa Ana Orange Countians (1929)
- Ballpark: Hawley Park

The Santa Ana Walnut Growers were minor league baseball team based in Santa Ana, California in 1910. The Walnut Growers were succeeded by the short lived 1929 Santa Ana Orange Countians. Santa Ana teams played as members of the Class D level Southern California Trolley League in 1910 and California State League in 1929, hosting home minor league games at Hawley Park.

== History ==
=== 1910: Santa Ana Walnut Growers ===
Minor league baseball was first hosted in Santa Ana, California in 1910, when the Santa Ana "Walnut Growers" became founding members of the Class D level Southern California Trolley League.

Redondo Beach was one of six charter franchises when the league formed for the 1910 season under league president Jim McCormick and league secretary was Santa Ana's Ed Crolic who, in some sources, is listed as the team's manager. The Walnut Growers joined franchises from Long Beach, California (Long Beach Clothiers), Los Angeles, California (Los Angeles McCormicks and Los Angeles Maiers), Pasadena, California (Pasadena Silk Sox) and Redondo Beach, California (Redondo Beach Wharf Rats) to form the league.

The league's "Trolley" name was in reference to all the league franchises, Santa Ana included, being located in the greater Los Angeles, California area, where the league ballparks were accessible from each other via trolley. Some references refer to the 1910 Santa Ana team as the "Yellow Sox."

When Santa Ana and the Southern California Trolley League began play in 1910, games were scheduled only on Sundays, with play to continue all year long. The Walnut Growers officially began play on April 3, 1910, under their manager, referenced as "Meats" in some places and league secretary Ed Crolic in others.

As the season progressed, both the Santa Ana Walnut Growers and Redondo Beach were the top league teams. After three weeks of play, both teams had 3–0 records, after seven weeks they were both 6–1 and after ten weeks they were tied with 8–2 records. In week eleven, the two teams met, and Redondo Beach ended the tie in the standings, defeating Santa Ana by the score of 8–2. This was the final week of league play.

The Southern California Trolley League had franchises that faced immediate financial difficulty when play began. On May 3, 1910, the Pasadena Silk Sox and the Los Angeles Maiers franchises folded simultaneously, reducing the league to four remaining teams. On June 13, 1910, the entire Southern California Trolley League permanently disbanded. At the time the league folded, the Redondo Beach Warf Rats (9–2) were in first place in the California Trolley League Standings, followed by the Santa Ana Walnut Growers (8–3). The Long Beach Clothiers (4–5) and Los Angeles McCormicks (2–7) followed in the final Standings. After the league folded, it was reported that league president Jim McCormick organized a league meeting at his pool hall on South Spring Street for the purpose of settling the league's remaining business affairs.

=== 1929: Santa Ana Orange Countiers ===
Minor league baseball returned briefly to Santa Ana in 1929. The Santa Ana Orange "Countiers" began the season as members of the four–team Class D level California State League. On May 8, 1929, the Santa Ana franchise had a 4–20 record when the team moved to become the short–lived Pomona Arabs. After six games in their new locale, Pomona (2–4) moved to Coronado County on May 15, 1929, playing as the Coronado Arabs. The league itself folded on June 17, 1929. At the time the league folded, the combined team finished last, placing fourth with a 22–38 overall record. Managed by Jess Orndorff and Pinch Thomas the Santa Ana/Pomona/Coronado team finished 12.5 games behind the first place San Diego Aces in the final standings.

Santa Ana has not hosted another minor league team.

== The ballpark ==
The Santa Ana teams played home minor league games at Hawley Park.

== Timeline ==
Year(s)	# Yrs.	Team	Level	League	Ballpark
1910	1	Santa Ana Walnut Growers	Class D	Southern California League	Hawley Park
1929	1	Santa Ana Orange Countiers	Class D	California State League	Hawley Park

== Year–by–year records ==
Year	Record	Finish	Manager	Notes
1910	8–3	2nd	"Meats" or Ed Crolic	League folded June 12
1929	22–38	4th	Jess Orndorff / Pinch Thomas	Moved to Pomona (4–20) May 8 League folded June 17

== Notable alumni ==
- Jess Orndorff (1929, MGR)
- Pinch Thomas (1929, MGR)
- The complete player roster for the 1910 Santa Ana team is unknown.
