= Gaviña Gourmet Coffee =

American coffee company

- Company type: Private
- Industry: Coffee
- Founded: 1870 Cuba and 1967 U.S.
- Headquarters: Vernon, California
- Products: Whole Bean Coffee; Merchandise
- Website: www.gavina.com

Gaviña Gourmet Coffee (also F. Gaviña & Sons Inc) is a coffee importer and roaster located in Vernon, California. It produces the Don Francisco's Coffee, Gaviña and La Llave coffee brands, as well as private label (own brand) coffees.

== History ==
The company was founded by brothers José María and Ramón Gaviña, who emigrated from Spain to Cuba in 1870 and operated their own coffee plantation in the city of Trinidad. In the 1930s, the company's business expanded to include coffee roasting as well as coffee growing.

In 1959, the family left Cuba, establishing F. Gaviña & Sons Inc in Vernon eight years later. Initially, the company focused on roasting Cuban-style coffee, but later expanded into coffees for other ethnic markets, including blends to appeal to Middle Eastern and Vietnamese palates.

== Operation ==
By 2002, Gaviña's whole-bean coffee was the top-selling brand in Los Angeles grocery stores, with its ground coffee ranked third behind Folgers and Maxwell House and the company decided to expand supermarket supplies to other regions of the US.

Gaviña had begun selling its coffee to a small group of McDonald's restaurants in Southern California in 1983 and, in 2005, it created a stronger blend that resulted in double-digit growth in coffee sales through the fast-food outlets. It was one of three U.S. suppliers subsequently chosen to produce espresso for the McCafe program.

By 2010, Gaviña was roasting about 40 million pounds of coffee per year and was an $114m business, with a fifth of revenue from making and packaging private label coffees for McDonald's, 7-Eleven and Costco stores, according to the Los Angeles Times. The company, which remains family owned, still produces roasts for different ethnic markets, as well as supplying supermarkets, such as Ralphs, Walmart and Safeway. It sells coffee in 20 states and its range includes the Don Francisco and La Llave brands.
