= Gilbert D. Smith =

American politician (born 1933/34)

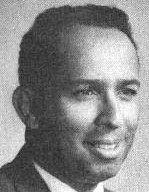
- Gilbert Smith, mayor of Carson

Mayor of Carson
- In office 1970–1971
- Preceded by: John L. Junk
- Succeeded by: John H. Leahy
- In office 1974–1975
- Preceded by: Sak Yamamoto
- Succeeded by: Clarence A. Bridgers

City Council of Carson
- In office February 1968 – March 1980

Personal details
- Born: 1933 or 1934 (age 92–93)
- Spouse: Glenda Smith
- Children: 3

Gilbert D. Smith (born 1933/1934) is an American politician who served as the first African-American mayor of Carson, California.

== Biography ==
Smith was born in Los Angeles and attended Los Angeles public schools. In 1952, he graduated from Manual Arts High School and then went on to study commercial art at the Los Angeles Trade–Technical College. He operates his own commercial art business. Smith was active in community organizations which led to his involvement in the Dominguez-Carson incorporation movement (Dominguez being one of the proposed names for the new city) and served as chairman of the Dominguez-Carson Coordinating Council.

In 1968, he was elected as one of five members to the first City Council of Carson, incorporated February 20, 1968. In 1970, he was elected to a four-year term on the City Council and then was appointed mayor in a unanimous vote by the City Council succeeding John L. Junk. Carson was less than 20% African-American at the time. In June 1970, he implemented a summer jobs program to take idle teens off the streets. He also set an action list to tackle the largest problems that he identified in the city: the limited regulation of the city's 97 junk and salvage yards; the proximity of residential areas to the city's seven refineries; and the future use of closed dump sites. The city of 75,000 was also bisected by three freeways diving the city into separate communities and had little in the way of shopping or recreation.

In November 1970, the city was raked with allegations of bribery charging the city's prior mayor, John Junk, an incumbent councilmember, Dannie H. Spence, a former deputy district attorney and attorney general who were both from Carson, a member of Carson's Environmental Control Commission, and a former member of the Parks and Recreation Commission; they were all charged with soliciting bribes to resolve zoning matters. Smith froze all new zoning requests for review. In December 1970, he dedicated the Main Street project, paid for with gas taxes, which created a shopping and recreational street for the city. In January 1971, he was appointed to the transportation committee of League of California Cities, Los Angeles County Division. In May 1971, the City Council appointed John H. Leahy as mayor. In October 1971, the city broken ground on a new post office. In May 1973, Smith unsuccessfully ran for the open seat in the 67th district of the California Assembly after the death of Larry Townsend running on a platform of using tax revenues to develop more mass transportation to reduce pollution, and to reevaluate the need for so many freeways, in particular, the Century Freeway. In March 1974, he won re-election to the City Council in a nine-way race competing for two open seats finishing second with 991 votes to John A. Marbut (1,050 votes). He was reappointed mayor, succeeding Sak Yamamoto, and was faced with the approval of a $5.4 million budget with nearly all of it dedicated to the current provision of services (with a $22,000 cushion). In May 1975, he was named a vice chairman of the United Way. In 1975, John Marbut was appointed mayor. In the same year, the Council rejected opening new waste facilities in city. In January 1977, he was named as president of the California League of Cities and tasked with assisting California cities to manage reductions in property taxes without losing revenues. Smith was credited with helping to transform Carson from a hodgepodge city of salvage yards and refineries bisected by highways to a city with a vibrant shopping corridor that derives all its revenues from sales and gas taxes. In March 1978, he won re-election to the City Council in a ten-way race competing for two open seats finishing first with 3,065 votes to John A. Marbut (3,031 votes). Smith announced that he would resign in November 1979 although after the successful recall of councilmen Sak Yamamoto and John Marbut, he would stay on until March 1980.

== Personal life ==
He is married to Glenda Smith; they have three sons.

== See also ==
- List of first African-American mayors
- African American mayors in California
