= List of mayors of Carson, California =

Mayor of Carson
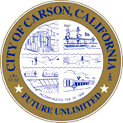

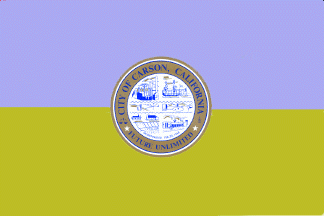

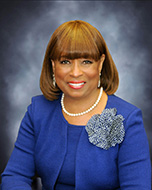
- Incumbent; Lula Davis-Holmes since November 3, 2020
- Term length: 4 years
- First holder: John A. Marbut

The following is a list of mayors of Carson, California.

== Mayors of Carson ==
Image	Mayor	Years	Notes
	John A. Marbut	1968–1969	first mayor of Carson
	John L. Junk	1969–1970	Sentenced to a 90-day jail term and fined $1,500 after pleading no contest on Sept. 7, 1971 to soliciting bribes from a trash disposal firm.
	Gilbert D. Smith	1970–1971	first African-American mayor
	John H. Leahy	1971–1972	
	John A. Marbut (2nd term)	1972–1973	
	Sak Yamamoto	1973–1974	first Asian mayor of Carson
	Gilbert D. Smith (2nd term)	1974–1975	
	Clarence A. Bridgers	1975–1976	2nd African-American mayor
	John A. Marbut (3rd term)	1976–1977	
	Sak Yamamoto (2nd and 3rd terms)	1977–1979	Two consecutive terms
	Kay A. Calas	1979–1980	first female mayor of Carson
	Clarence A. Bridgers (2nd term)	1980–1981	
	Thomas G. Mills (1st and 2nd terms)	1982–1984	3rd African-American mayor
	Kay A. Calas (2nd and 3rd terms)	1984–1985; 1985–1986	Two consecutive terms
	Sylvia L. Muise	1986–1987	2nd female mayor of Carson
	Kay A. Calas (4th and 5th terms)	1987–1988; 1988–1989	
	Michael I. Mitoma	1989–1990	2nd Asian mayor of Carson
	Vera Robles DeWitt	1990–1991	First Latino mayor of Carson
	Michael I. Mitoma (2nd and 3rd terms)	1991–1992; 1992–1997	From 1992, mayors were directly elected for 4-year terms Ordinance No. 94-1043 extended his term for an additional year to March 4, 1997
	Peter D. Fajardo	1997–2001	First Filipino mayor of Carson
	Daryl W. Sweeney	March 6, 2001 – July 29, 2003	4th African-American mayor Resigned July 29, 2003, position left vacant until 2004 election
	Jim Dear	April 6, 2004 – 2009; 2009–2013; 2013–2015	Resigned in 2015 after being elected as City Clerk
	Albert Robles	2015–2016; 2016–2020	2nd Latino mayor of Carson; Appointed to finish term of Jim Dear and then elected in 2016
	Lula Davis-Holmes	2020–Present	First female African-American mayor
