= Vernon, California =

City in California, United States

- City
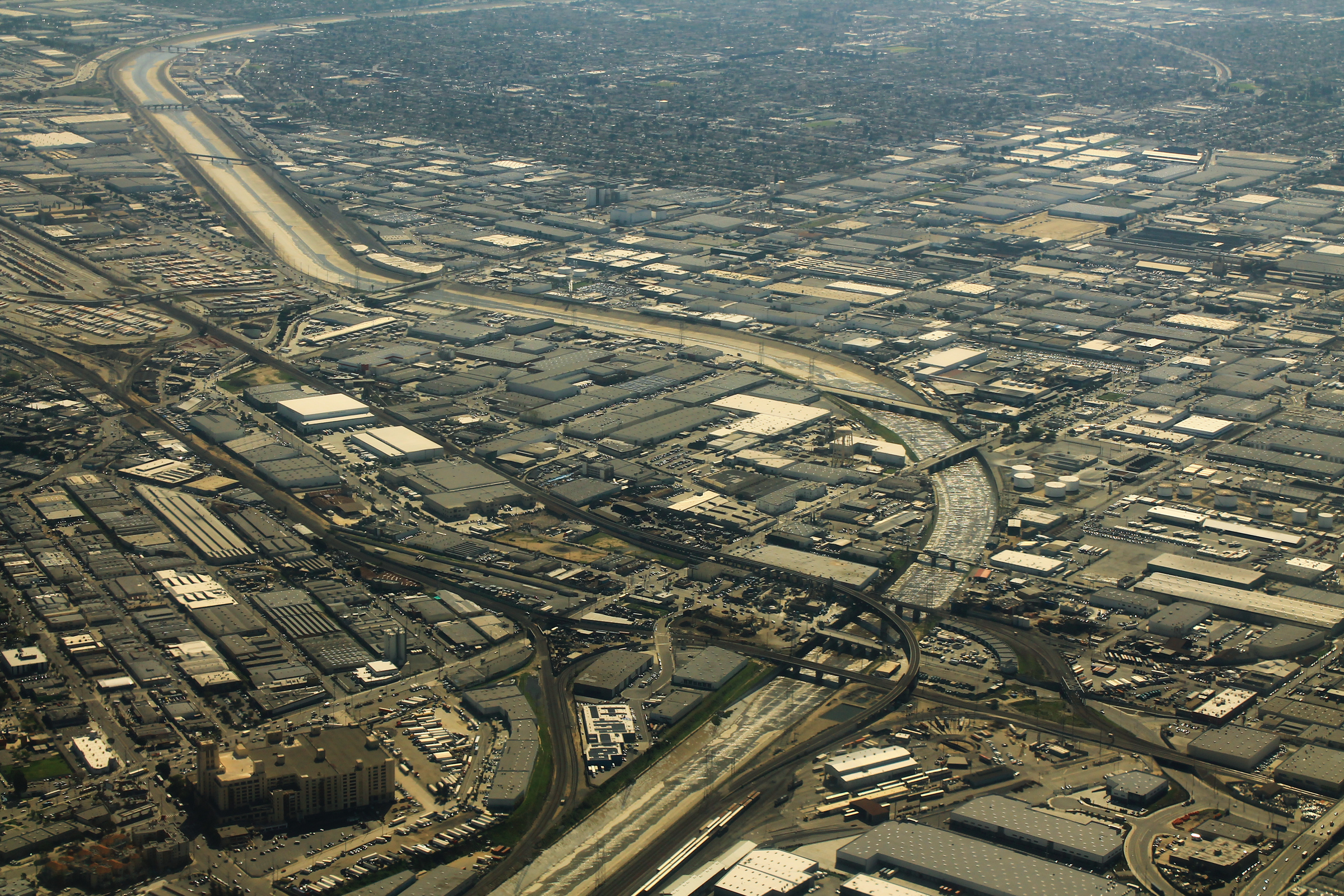
- Aerial view of Vernon

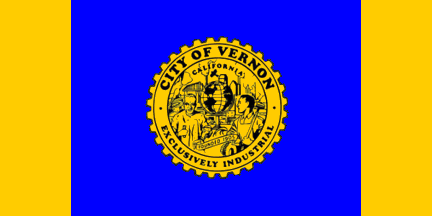
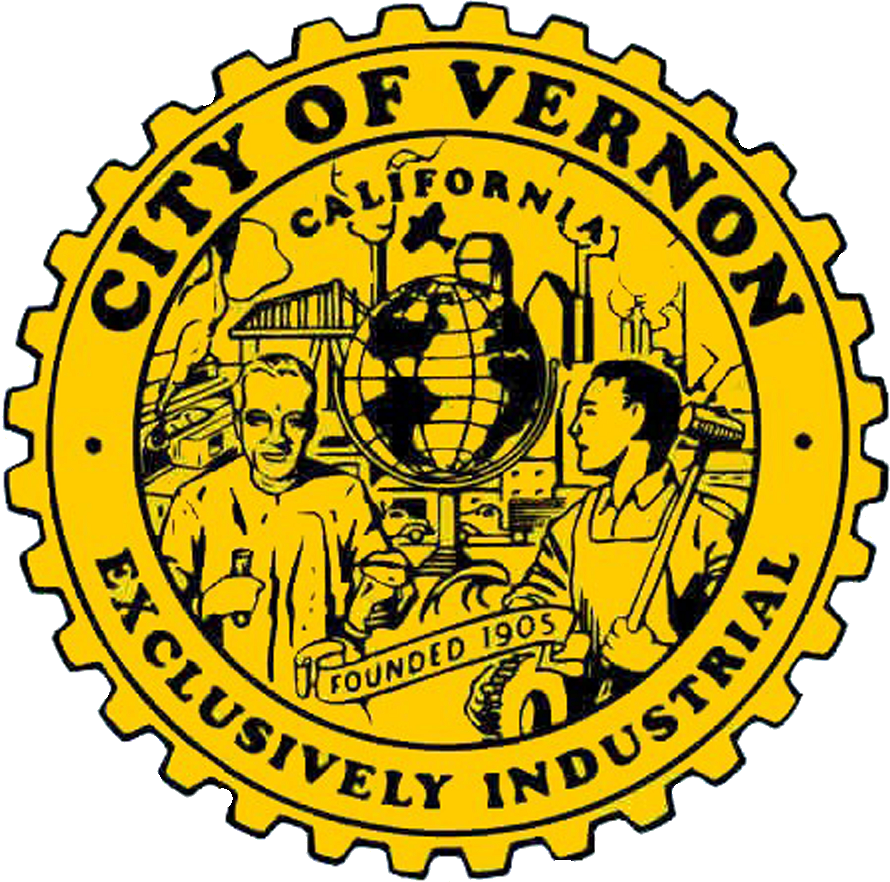
- Flag Seal
- Motto: "Exclusively Industrial!"
- Interactive map of Vernon, California
- Location in the United States
- Coordinates: 34°0′4″N 118°12′40″W
- Country: United States
- State: California
- County: Los Angeles
- Incorporated: September 22, 1905

Government
  - Type: Council-Administrator
  - Mayor: Leticia Lopez
  - Mayor Pro Tempore: Melissa Ybarra
  - City Council: Jesus Rivera; Crystal Larios; Judith Merlo
  - City Administrator: Brian Saeki

Area
  - Total: 5.16 sq mi (13.36 km^{2})
  - Land: 4.97 sq mi (12.88 km^{2})
  - Water: 0.19 sq mi (0.48 km^{2}) 3.57%
- Elevation: 203 ft (62 m)

Population (2020)
  - Total: 222
  - Estimate (2024): 211
  - Density: 45/sq mi (17.2/km^{2})
- Time zone: UTC−8 (Pacific)
  - Summer (DST): UTC−7 (PDT)
- ZIP Code: 90058
- Area code: 323
- FIPS code: 06-82422
- GNIS feature IDs: 1661636, 2412150
- Website: cityofvernonca.gov

Vernon is a city five miles (8 km) south of downtown Los Angeles, California, United States, the nearest separate city to downtown Los Angeles. The population was 112 at the 2010 United States census, the lowest of any incorporated city in the state. Its population nearly doubled to 222 by the 2020 census, making it the second least populous city in the state, after Amador City.

The city is primarily composed of industrial areas and touts itself as "exclusively industrial". Meatpacking plants and warehouses are common. As of 2006, there were no parks in the city.

== History ==
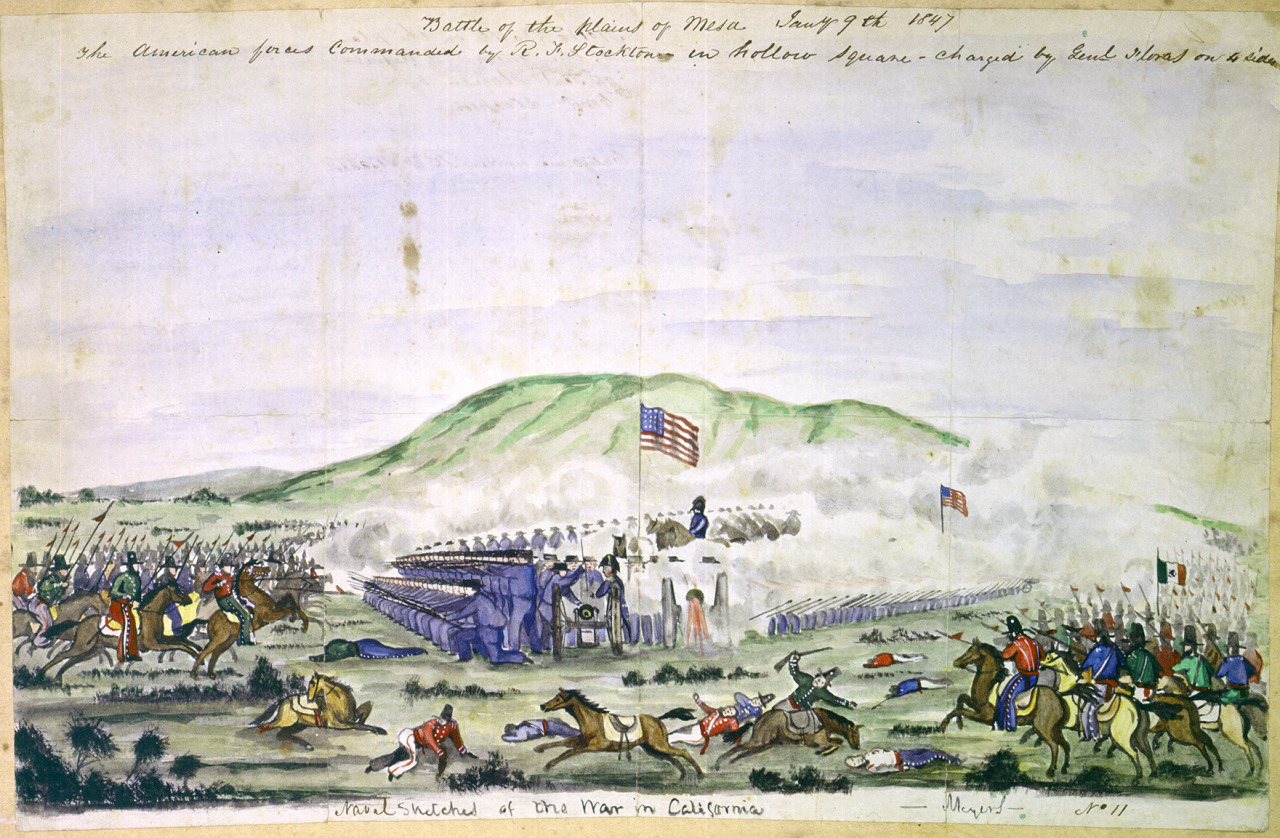
The Battle of La Mesa was the last battle fought between the Americans and the Californios during the Conquest of California.

Vernon is the site of the Battle of La Mesa on January 9, 1847, when General Stephen W. Kearny again defeated General José María Flores the day after the Battle of Río San Gabriel. Accepting defeat, General Flores fled southeast to Sonora, while Major Pico headed north into the San Gabriel Mountains with a hundred Californios. This ended hostilities in Alta California during the Mexican–American War of 1846–1848. By the dawn of the 20th century, it was a stretch of unincorporated grassland near Los Angeles' flourishing downtown.

In 1905, Vernon was incorporated by ranchers James J. and Thomas J. Furlong and John B. Leonis, a merchant. Vernon was incorporated to promote industrial development along the railroads in the area. John Leonis, of Basque origin, had come to Southern California in 1880 to work for his uncle, Miguel Leonis, and later established his own ranch on unincorporated county land southeast of downtown Los Angeles. Recognizing the importance of the three major railroads running through the area, he persuaded railroad executives to run spur tracks off the main lines and incorporated the adjacent three miles (4.8 km) as the first "exclusively industrial" city in the southwestern United States. He named the new city after a dirt road, Vernon Avenue, that crossed its center.

In 1907, on land leased from Leonis, the founders of the city marketed Vernon as a "sporting town". The Vernon Arena was known for its 20-round boxing matches. Shortly thereafter, the Pacific Coast League built a baseball park. The Vernon Tigers, a minor league baseball team in the Pacific Coast League, played from 1909 through 1925. The team won back-to-back PCL pennants in 1919 and 1920. The ballpark also housed two 1910 Southern California Trolley League teams, the Los Angeles Maiers and the Los Angeles McCormicks.

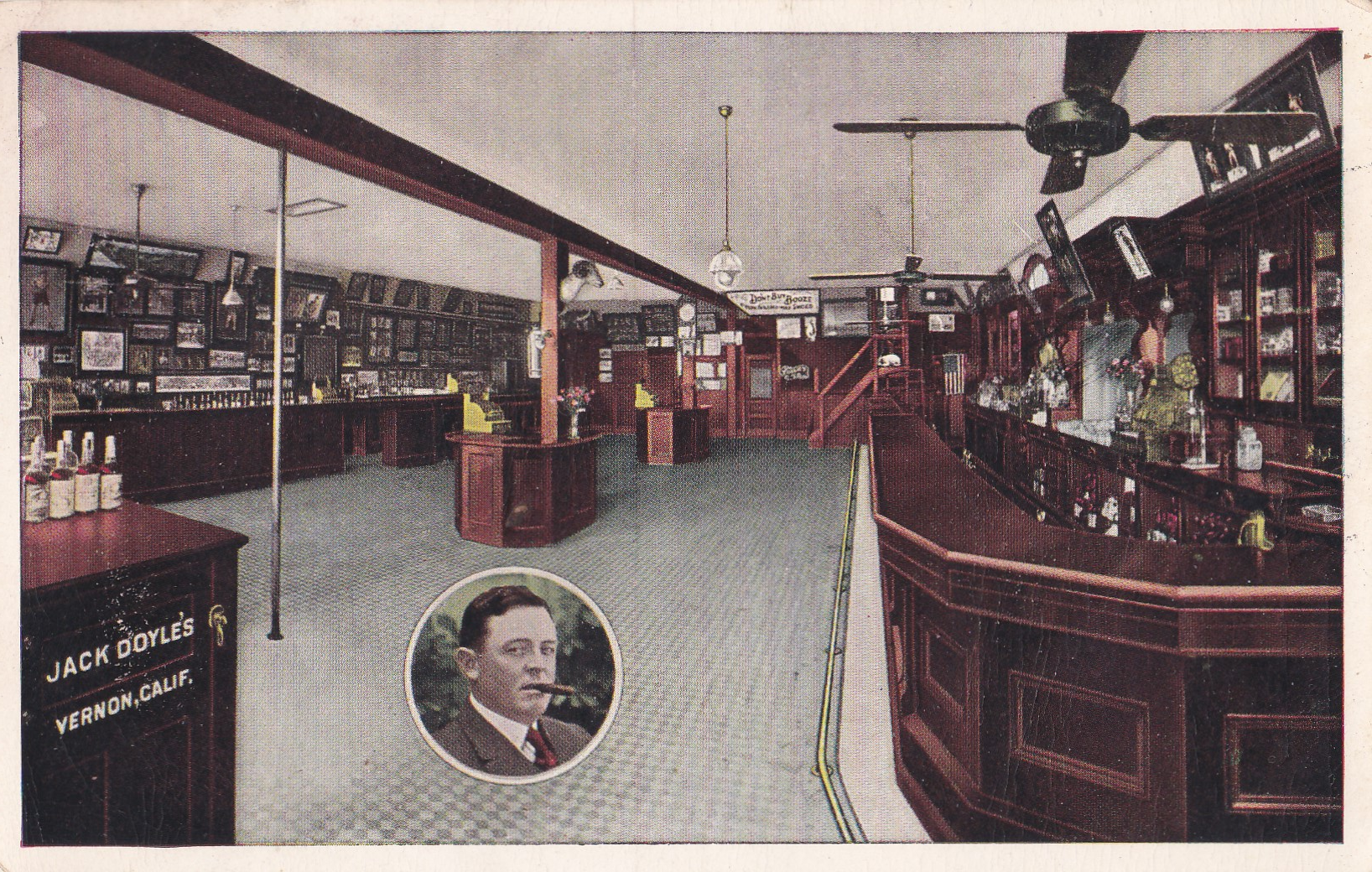
Jack Doyle's bar, Vernon, California (George Rice & Sons printers, Los Angeles, c. 1916)

Leonis created an enticing attraction, leasing property to the founders of the city, for a baseball stadium, a 7,000-seat boxing arena, and the "world's longest bar", 100 feet long with thirty-seven bartenders. The Vernon Country Club was a popular night spot for young Hollywood for a time, especially during a brief window before national prohibition was instituted where Los Angeles was "dry" but Vernon still permitted the sale of alcohol. As industrialists from the East Coast traveled to Vernon for heavyweight matches, Leonis sold many of them on locating their West Coast factories in Vernon. By the 1930s, Owens-Illinois and Alcoa had facilities there, purchasing subsidized electricity from the new utility Vernon Light & Power.

While some land adjacent to the original incorporated area was excluded from the city in 1910 and 1924, land to the east and south was incorporated in 1914, 1920, 1925, 1926 and 1928. The most important of these was that of 1925, when almost 800 acres of the Central Manufacturing District, which was already built up with 28 industrial plants, adding an assessed valuation of $8 million to the city's resources. This annexation was voted up unanimously by Mr & Mrs A. J. Olsen, of 4318 S. Downey Road, the only two legal voters in the district. Such selective annexations ensured industrial areas were brought within the city, while residential areas were excluded.

The Studebaker factory was built in 1938 at 4530 Loma Vista Avenue. It was the company's only West Coast factory, producing 64 cars a day. It was closed in 1956, and ten years later in 1966, Studebaker folded.

Following Leonis' death in 1953, he left behind an estate reportedly worth $8 million, as well as several parcels of land, to his grandson Leonis. Leonis Malburg first won a council seat in 1956 and was elected mayor in 1974.

The Poxon China Company was founded by George Wade Poxon (b. 1887, Castle Donington, Leicestershire, England) and his wife Judith (née Furlong), who in 1913 were married at St. Martha's Church in Vernon. The church had been built by the Furlong family in 1913. George Wade Poxon, a cousin of George Albert Wade (later Colonel Sir George Albert Wade), was well known as the chairman of Wade Potteries Limited in England, which produced Wade Whimsies. George Wade (b. about 1863 Tunstall, Staffordshire, father to George Albert Wade and uncle to George Wade Poxon) owned a pottery in Burslem, Staffordshire, England. The Wade family had been associated with the pottery industry for many years. George Wade Poxon was a member of the Royal Science Academy. At the age of 24, in 1911, he emigrated to the United States. The kilns were located on the Furlong ranch.

Vernon Kilns was founded in July 1931 after Faye G. Bennison purchased the Poxon China Company in Vernon. The Poxon China Company had its headquarters on 52nd Street, which is now part of Los Angeles. Bennison continued to produce Poxon lines, using Poxon shapes until an earthquake in 1933 forced Bennison to develop new and original shapes for the company. Two fires in the late 1940s almost destroyed Vernon Potteries, Ltd., but Bennison rebuilt and the company continued to thrive. The company was not able to compete when foreign imports flooded the US. In 1958 Vernon Kilns sold all its holdings to Metlox. Metlox continued to market some Vernon shapes and patterns under the division Vernonware until 1989. The company produced dinnerware, art pottery, figurines, ashtrays and other popular items. All products were of earthenware, with clays from Tennessee, Kentucky, North Carolina, and England. Glazes were developed from minerals mined in California, and many patterns, including all of the plaids, were hand painted.

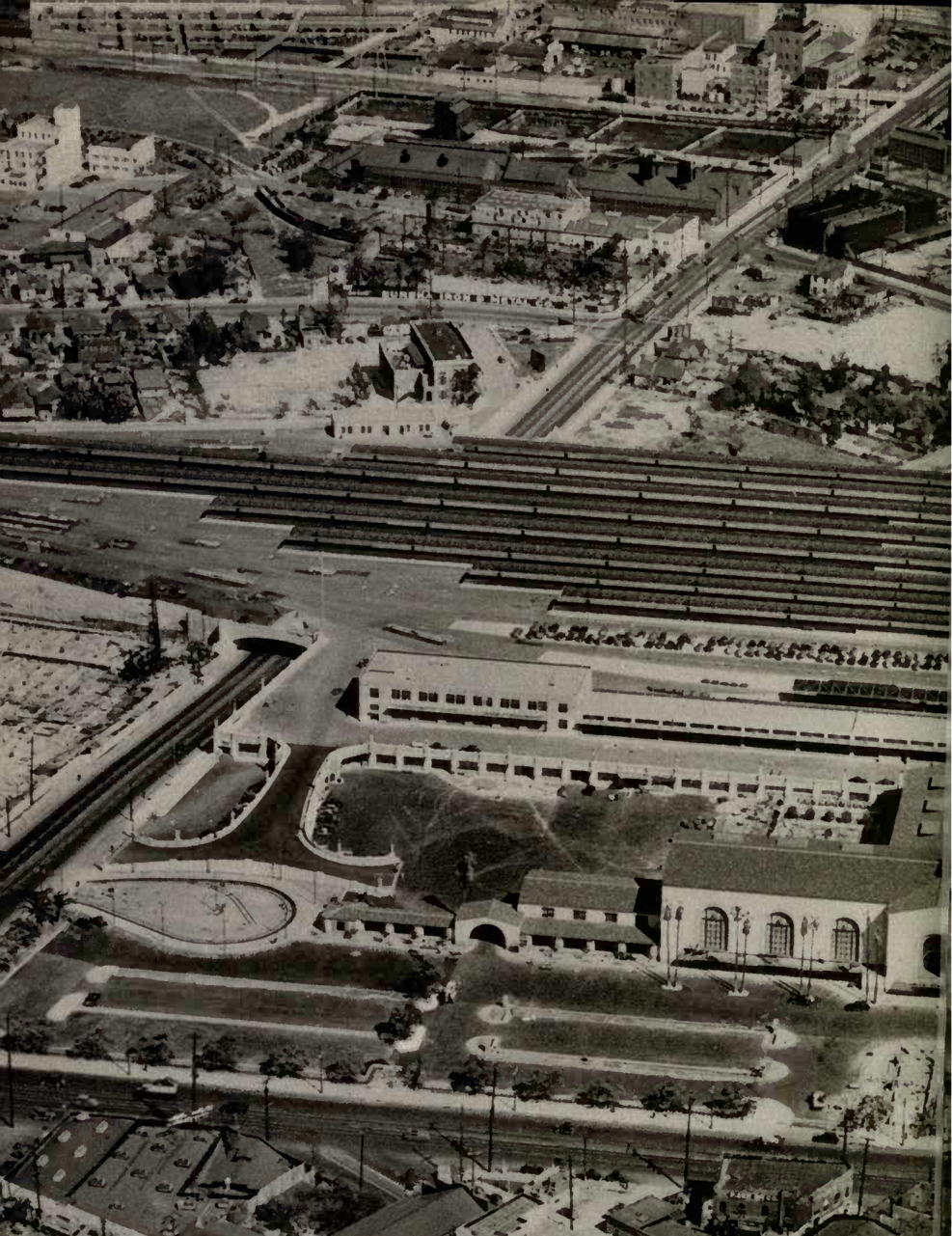
"Airview of Industrial Section" (1941 American Guide to Los Angeles)

Vernon returned to being exclusively industrial around 1919. Two giant stockyards were opened and meat packing quickly became the city's main industry. Twenty-seven slaughterhouses and the Los Angeles Union Stock Yards eventually lined Vernon Avenue from Soto Street to Downey Road until the late 1960s.

The 1940s and 1950s added aerospace contractors Norris Industries, box and paper manufacturers, drug companies such as Brunswig, and food processors General Mills and Kal Kan. Giant meat packers Farmer John and Swift flourished.

In 1932, after a dispute with Southern California Edison over industrial rates for electricity, John Leonis sponsored a bond measure to authorize the building of a city-owned power plant, which is still operational today, providing the city with its notably lower utility rate.

=== Elections of 2006 ===
The city held no contested or meaningfully competitive elections from 1980 to 2006. Out of five city council members serving in 2006, only one had been chosen by the voters, the other four having been appointed to their positions by city officials.

Most of the city's fewer than 90 voters were city employees or connected to city employees who lived in homes rented at a nominal fee. In 1979 a firefighter tried to run for mayor and was immediately evicted and told he couldn't run.

In 2006, a few people moved into Vernon and ran for city council, the first time in more than two decades that there was a competitive race for city council. Eight people converted a 1950s-era office building into a five-room apartment (the building had previously been used as a tanning facility turning sheepskin into billiard/pool pockets), and three of them filed to run for office. In response, the city turned off their power and attempted to evict them as illegal squatters. The City of Vernon alleged that the men were part of a hostile takeover attempt by convicted felon Albert T. Robles, who nearly bankrupted the nearby city of South Gate as treasurer, and Eduardo Olivo, a former Vernon attorney who also worked with Albert T. Robles in South Gate. The city tried to cancel their registrations but was ordered to allow them to run and to count the ballots.

On June 30, California Secretary of State Bruce McPherson called on the city to count the votes and expressed his support for the state to take over the responsibility of conducting the city's elections. During the trial it was alleged that all three of the newcomer candidates had direct ties to Albert T. Robles: Alejandro Lopez is a first cousin, David Johnson Jr. is the brother-in-law of a business partner, and Don A. Huff is associated through Eduardo Olivo. In March 2006, Judge David P. Yaffe ruled that the city could not prohibit legally registered voters who reside within its boundaries from running for city council. The city had to be ordered to allow the election to proceed. An election was held under a court order on April 11, 2006. But the city clerk, Bruce Malkenhorst Jr., refused to count the ballots until the legal disputes were resolved, and temporarily ordered the ballots to be sealed. In August 2006, Los Angeles Superior Court Judge Aurelio Munoz ruled that the newcomers received free rent and jobs prior to registering to vote and that they were involved in a scheme orchestrated by Albert T. Robles and Eduardo Olivo to "steal" the election, but that such actions were not illegal. On October 16, 2006, it was announced that city officials were ready to count the votes from the contested April 11 election. The officials failed to prove their claim of voter fraud. A judge granted Vernon's motion to count the votes. The challengers lost by a landslide.

=== Corruption ===
==== Corruption charges ====
On November 15, 2006, the investigation into alleged public corruption in Vernon resulted in charges against the city's mayor, Leonis Malburg, as well as his wife, his son, and the former city administrator. The Los Angeles District Attorney's office had launched an investigation in April 2005 upon allegations that the city's former administrator, Bruce Malkenhorst Sr., had misappropriated public funds for personal use.

Their investigation uncovered evidence of voter fraud on the part of the ruling family, which, it was asserted, tried to keep out new residents. Leonis Malburg, who had been mayor since 1974, claimed he lived in a small Vernon apartment in the 2800 block of Leonis Boulevard (named after his grandfather, also a mayor), when in fact he was living in upscale Hancock Park, Los Angeles. His wife and son also claimed to live in Vernon, voting in Vernon elections although evidence indicated they too lived in Hancock Park. Charges against the Malburgs included voter fraud, assisting unqualified voters, false registration, and perjury.

Malkenhorst Sr. was charged with 18 counts of "misappropriation of public funds" for reportedly taking $60,000 of city money for personal use. His salary from the city had been $600,000. Malkenhorst at one time collected a pension of $499,674.84. In 2010, Malkenhorst received a reported $510,000 annual pension, plus health benefits, as former city administrator, the most of any of the 9,111 retired California government workers receiving pensions from CalPERS. Malkenhorst retired in 2005.

==== Corruption allegations ====
Expanding legal action against excessive salaries and pensions in two southeast Los Angeles County cities, then-Attorney General Jerry Brown had subpoenaed testimony from the City of Vernon. Brown's subpoena sought testimony under oath from Vernon officials about compensation and pension benefits for six highly paid city officials, one of whom received more than $1.6 million in a single year from the city.

According to media reports and other sources, former Vernon city administrator Eric T. Fresch was paid $1.65 million in 2008. In 2009 O'Callaghan was paid $785,000, Burnett, $570,000, and Harrison, $800,000. Malkenhorst Jr. was paid $290,000 in 2008. Malkenhorst Sr., who was also charged with misappropriation of public funds, retired in 2005, and as a former employee, still receives a pension that is the highest in the state of California. Malkenhorst Sr. was convicted of fraud and had been under investigation for several other charges. Malkenhorst pleaded guilty in May 2011 to illegally using public money to pay for personal items. Prosecutors said that from 2000 to 2005, he was illegally reimbursed for personal expenses that included meals, golfing, massages, a personal trainer, and a home security system. He received three years' probation and was fined $35,000, including penalties. He was ordered to repay $60,000 in restitution. He was fined $10,000 in addition to other penalties. His total of $105,000 in fines will be no problem for Malkenhurst, who continues to receive the highest public pension in California: $509,664. "The law states that pensions are revoked if an elected official is convicted of a felony, but not in the case of an employee," said Brad Pacheco, a spokesman for CalPERS. Malkenhorst "would continue to receive his pension according to the law."

In September 2010, the Los Angeles Times reported that the inquiry followed the newspaper's report that Donal O'Callaghan, then city administrator, received $243,898 in consulting payments through June 2010, through Tara Energy, Inc., the company run by his wife, Kimberly McBride. The payments were in addition to O'Callaghan's yearly salary of $380,000. He was accused of corruption for his role in obtaining city jobs for his wife. O'Callaghan was indicted by a Los Angeles grand jury on three felony counts of conflict of interest and misappropriation of public funds. He pleaded not guilty to two felony counts of conflict of interest involving contracts and one of public officer crime.

The Los Angeles Times reported that Eric Fresch, who now serves as a legal consultant, has been paid over $1 million for the last four years. He was paid almost $1.65 million in salary and hourly billings in 2008, when he was serving as both city administrator and deputy city attorney. Others in Vernon received $570,000 to $800,000 in 2009. Former City Attorney Jeffrey A. Harrison earned $800,000 in 2009, and City Treasurer/Finance Director Roirdan Burnett made $570,000. In 2008, Harrison was paid $1.04 million.

In 2010, Malburg, the former mayor for fifty years, was ordered to pay more than $500,000 after being found guilty of fraud. Prosecutors stated he claimed to live in Vernon but actually had a home in the wealthy Hancock Park area of Los Angeles. Leonis Malburg and his wife, Dominica, were convicted of voter fraud and other charges.

State Senator Tony Strickland (R-Moorpark) proposed a bill that would divest the pensions of any public official convicted of abusing public funds. The bill, SB115, was killed in a state Senate committee. The bill drew the ire of several employee groups, including the AFL–CIO, the California Professional Firefighters, and the California State Employees Association. These groups and the lawmakers who voted against the bill contended that "it discriminated against public employees relative to private employees and said such a law would really harm the innocent spouse and family of the convicted officer, who will lose their financial security." Strickland stated he was "shocked" that the bill was killed. "State law affects judges and elected officials, but not people like Rizzo," he said. "The argument about the family is a weak argument that can apply to any person convicted of a crime. Families are always affected when you talk about criminals."

=== Disincorporation legislation ===
Vernon has dealt with the idea of disincorporation after city government corruption was discovered. In 2011, legislation was being considered to move to disincorporate the city. If this had taken effect, Vernon would be the third incorporated place in California to be disbanded in the past forty years, after Cabazon in 1972 and Hornitos in 1973. California State Assemblyman John Pérez submitted a bill to the California legislature which would have disincorporated Vernon as a city. The allegations of rampant corruption prompted the state Assembly to approve Pérez's proposed legislation, AB46, to disincorporate cities with fewer than 150 residents. Vernon is the only city that would have been affected by the bill.

According to an editorial in the April 26, 2011, edition of the Long Beach Press-Telegram, support to maintain Vernon's city status came from two powerful groups that were rarely allied: The business community (including the California, Los Angeles, and Vernon chambers of commerce) and the labor community (including the Los Angeles Federation of Labor and the Teamsters) joined in the battle against Sacramento. Both groups acknowledged that Vernon needed a comprehensive political housecleaning, but both maintained its right to cityhood. Gloria Molina, a member of the Los Angeles County Board of Supervisors, which has voted in support of disincorporating Vernon, stated: It is a "company town masquerading as a city." "The city has been a facade for some personal gain issues. The residents are employees of the city or major companies and consequently are controlled." The bill had passed in the Assembly on a bipartisan vote of 58–7.

In the last few weeks of the legislative session of summer 2011, a team of attorneys and lobbyists from Vernon were trying to kill the bill that would disincorporate the city when state Senator Kevin de Leon (D-Los Angeles) came to them with a creative and unconventional offer. De Leon, who had earlier supported disbanding Vernon, said he would help to defeat the legislation if Vernon would accept a proposed list of government reforms and set aside $60 million in order to fund community projects in the small, working-class cities that surround Vernon. Vernon agreed to the offer, and de Leon then proceeded to support the groups fighting disincorporation. City officials in nearby Huntington Park, which stood to receive some of Vernon's grant money, also reversed their support to the City of Vernon. On August 29, the state Senate rejected the bill to disband Vernon.

The Vernon City Council unanimously passed salary limits and other wide-ranging reforms on May 26, 2011. The council approved an amended package that cut the salaries of council members from $70,000 to $25,000 a year, but not beginning until the end of their current terms. Other officials, including the police chief, also saw their salaries trimmed. Department heads' salaries were capped at $267,000. Previously, some city officials allegedly made more than $1 million to govern the city. The council also authorized benefit reductions for officials, established a city housing commission, and voted to place a proposal on the city ballot that would change the city charter and limit council members to two, five-year terms. The city owns nearly all residential housing in town and there had been concerns that its officials were de facto landlords of the voters.

The reforms took the city of Vernon further toward a more open, transparent and inclusive governance structure," MacFarlane said. "The business community will have a role to play, as will representatives of labor, and those are two key constituencies." On August 2, 2011, former state attorney general John Van de Kamp, hired by the city to do an independent review of its policies, released a report that found "no significant fault" in Vernon's compliance with the Political Reform Act, conflict of interest policies, the Brown Act, or the Public Records Act.

=== Transparency and progress ===
In an effort to modernize the city and stave off the potential threat of disincorporation in the future, for the first time in the city's history Vernon opened its doors to new residents from the general public. In 2015, Vernon's population nearly doubled with the opening of Vernon Village Park Apartments on E. 52nd Drive and King Avenue, the majority of which were made available to the public and not exclusively to those affiliated with Vernon industry and city government, as had been the case for most of the city's history. In effect, this means that the democratic process in Vernon can no longer be a carefully managed internal affair used to keep already influential individuals in power, a major adjustment in its own right.

Facing significant revenue shortfalls, in 2017 the Vernon city government proposed "Measure Q" to voters, which would have generated additional revenue to fund the government via a tax increase on electricity generated and sold by the city to residents and industries. Vernon residents rejected the tax increase by a margin of nine votes, with 23 voting no, and only 14 voting in favor of the utility tax increase.

Vernon's City Council is composed of five members, each elected to a five-year term according to the city's charter. Voters elect one City Council member during the city's April municipal elections, which take place on a second Tuesday. Vernon is one of the cities opposed to California's Senate Bill 415, which prohibits stand-alone elections for city councils, K–12 public schools, community colleges, and special districts, consolidating them with even-year county, state, and federal primary and general elections.

== Geography ==
According to the United States Census Bureau, the city has a total area of 5.2 mi^{2} (13.5 km^{2}), of which 5.0 mi^{2} (12.9 km^{2}) is land and 0.2 mi^{2} (0.5 km^{2}), or 3.57%, is water.

== Demographics ==
Historical population
Census	Pop.	Note	%±
1910	772		—
1920	1,005		30.2%
1930	1,269		26.3%
1940	850		−33.0%
1950	432		−49.2%
1960	229		−47.0%
1970	261		14.0%
1980	90		−65.5%
1990	152		68.9%
2000	91		−40.1%
2010	112		23.1%
2020	222		98.2%
2024 (est.)	211	▼	−5.0%
U.S. Decennial Census; 1860–1870 1880-1890; 1900 1910 1920; 1930 1940 1950; 1960 1970 1980; 1990 2000 2010; 2020

Vernon first appeared as a city in the 1910 U.S. census as part of the now defunct San Antonio Township.

=== 2020 ===
Vernon city, California – Racial and ethnic composition Note: the US Census treats Hispanic/Latino as an ethnic category. This table excludes Latinos from the racial categories and assigns them to a separate category. Hispanics/Latinos may be of any race.
Race / Ethnicity (NH = Non-Hispanic)	Pop 2000	Pop 2010	Pop 2020	% 2000	% 2010	% 2020
White alone (NH)	9	58	14	9.89%	51.79%	6.31%
Black or African American alone (NH)	0	4	18	0.00%	3.57%	8.11%
Native American or Alaska Native alone (NH)	0	0	0	0.00%	0.00%	0.00%
Asian alone (NH)	1	2	14	1.10%	1.79%	6.31%
Native Hawaiian or Pacific Islander alone (NH)	0	0	0	0.00%	0.00%	0.00%
Other race alone (NH)	0	0	7	0.00%	0.00%	3.15%
Mixed race or Multiracial (NH)	0	0	1	0.00%	0.00%	0.45%
Hispanic or Latino (any race)	81	48	168	89.01%	42.86%	75.68%
Total	91	112	222	100.00%	100.00%	100.00%

=== 2010 ===
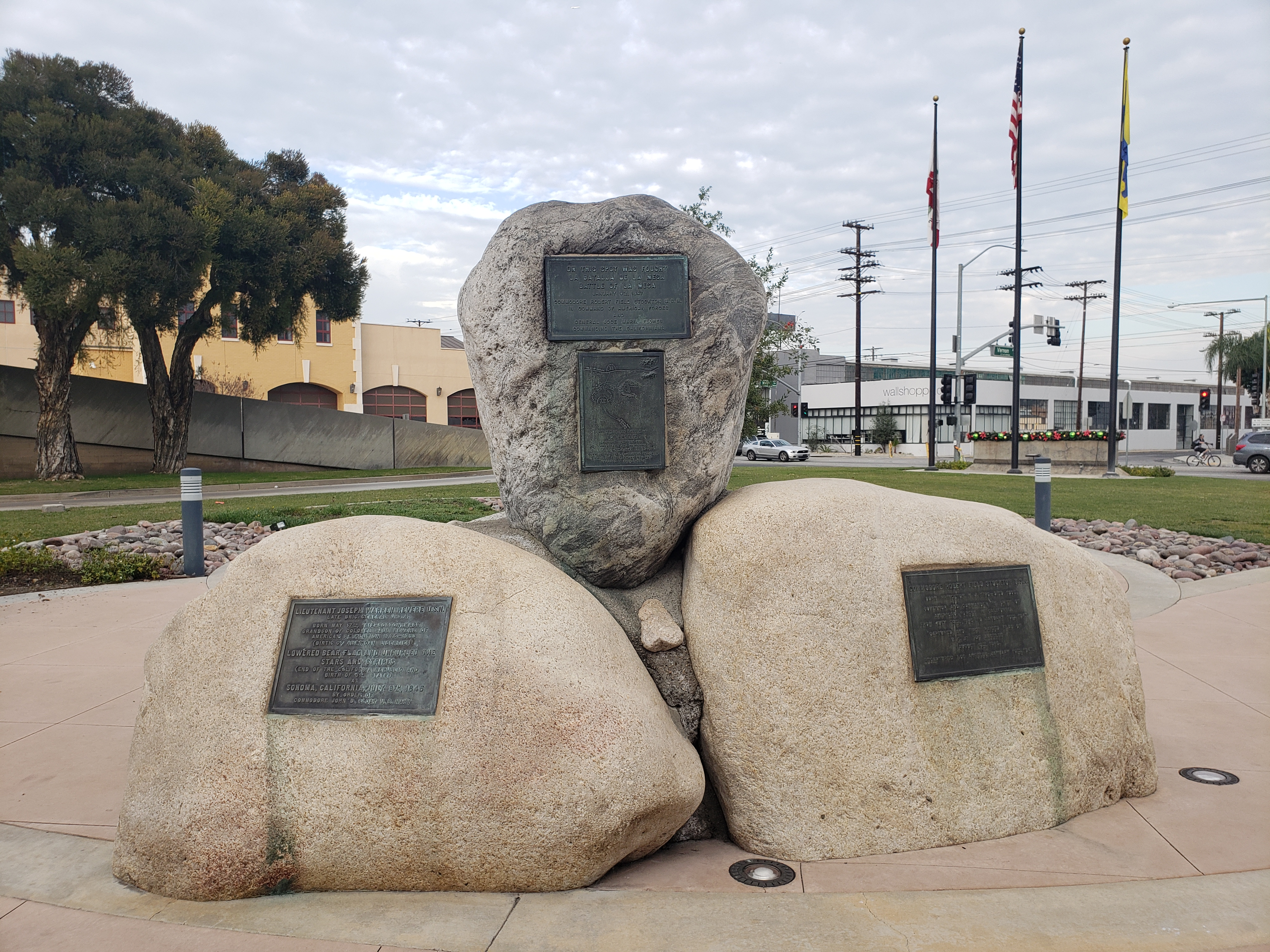
Memorial to the Battle of La Mesa

The 2010 United States census reported that Vernon had a population of 112. The population density was 21.7 people per square mile (8.4 people/km^{2}). The racial makeup of Vernon was 99 (88.4%) White (51.8% Non-Hispanic White), 4 (3.6%) African American, 0 (0%) Native American, 2 (1.8%) Asian, 0 (0%) Pacific Islander, 7 (6%) from other races, and 0 (0%) from two or more races. Hispanic or Latino of any race were 48 persons (42.9%).

The Census reported that 112 people (100% of the population) lived in households, 0 (0%) lived in non-institutionalized group quarters, and 0 (0%) were institutionalized.

There were 28 households, out of which 10 (36%) had children under the age of 18 living in them, 13 (46%) were opposite-sex married couples living together, 3 (11%) had a female householder with no husband present, 6 (21%) had a male householder with no wife present. There were 1 (9%) unmarried opposite-sex partnership and 0 (0%) same-sex married couples or partnerships. 5 households (18%) were made up of individuals, and 2 (7%) had someone living alone who was 65 years of age or older. The average household size was 4. There were 22 families (79% of all households); the average family size was 4.

The ages of the population were spread out, with 21 people (19%) under the age of 18, 11 people (10%) aged 18 to 24, 36 people (32%) aged 25 to 44, 30 people (27%) aged 45 to 64, and 14 people (13%) who were 65 years of age or older. The median age was 36.5 years. For every 100 females, there were 96.5 males. For every 100 females age 18 and over, there were 97.8 males.

There were 29 housing units at an average density of 5.6 units per square mile (2.2 units/km^{2}), of which 4 (14%) were owner-occupied, and 24 (86%) were occupied by renters. The homeowner vacancy rate was 0%; the rental vacancy rate was 4%. 10 people (9% of the population) lived in owner-occupied housing units and 102 people (91%) lived in rental housing units.

According to the 2010 United States census, Vernon had a median household income of $32,188, with 20.0% of the population living below the federal poverty line.

=== 2000 ===
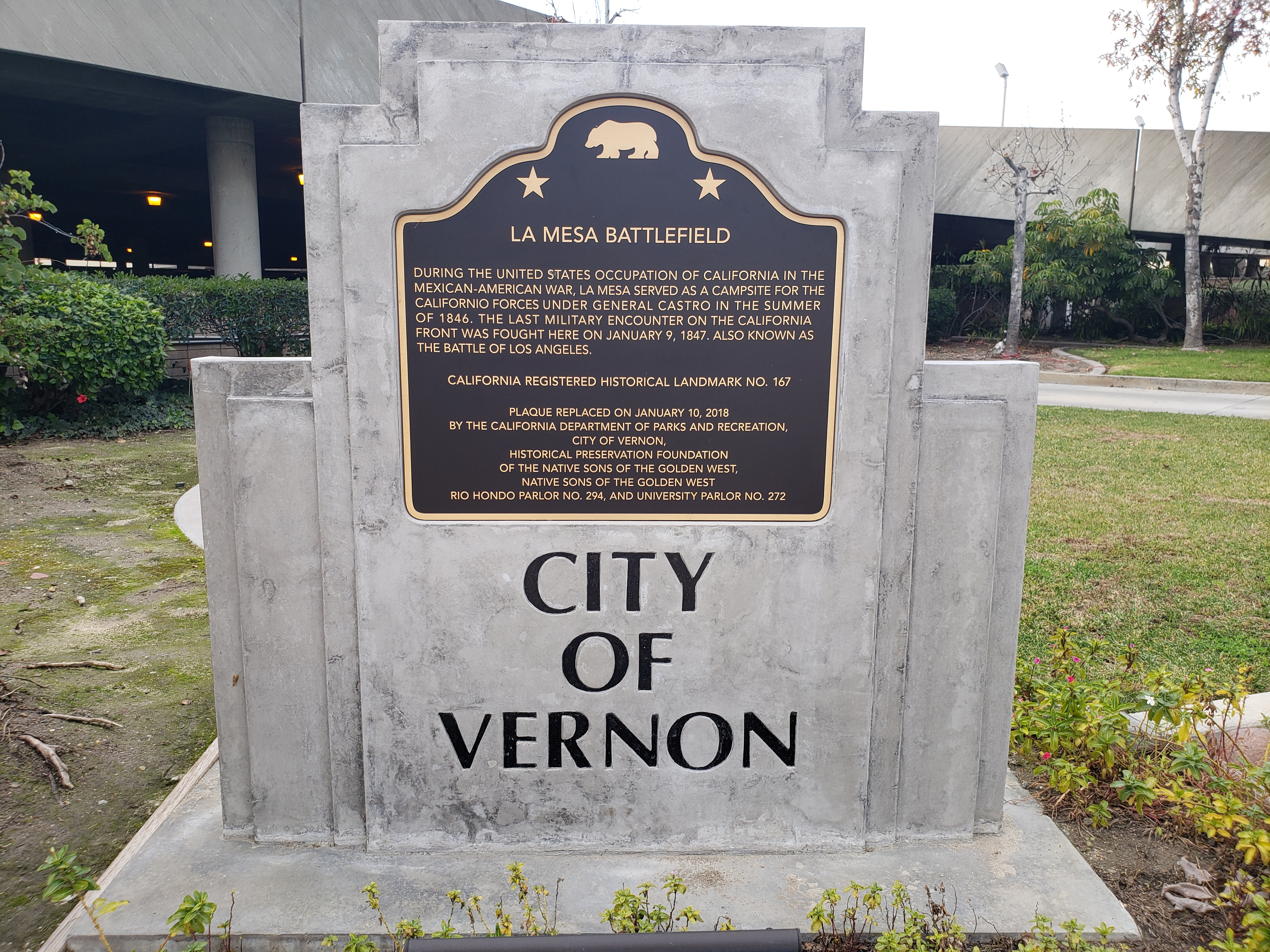
La Mesa Battlefield marker

The median income for a household in the city was $62,000, and the median income for a family was $62,575. Males had a median income of $46,250, versus $33,750 for females. The per capita income for the city was $17,812. None of the population and none of the families were below the poverty line.

Many of the 112 residents of Vernon were city employees. Many lived in housing owned by the city government. As of 2006, about 44,000 people who work in Vernon daily lived outside of Vernon.

Latino communities These were the ten cities or neighborhoods in Los Angeles County with the largest percentage of Latino residents, according to the 2000 census:

1. East Los Angeles, California, 96.7%
2. Maywood, California, 96.4%
3. City Terrace, California, 94.4%
4. Huntington Park, California, 95.1%
5. Boyle Heights, Los Angeles, 94.0%
6. Cudahy, California, 93.8%
7. Bell Gardens, California, 93.7%
8. Commerce, California 93.4%
9. Vernon, California, 92.6%
10. South Gate, California, 92.1%

Scotch-Irish and Hungarian were the most common ancestries. Mexico and the United Kingdom were the most common foreign places of birth.

== Economy ==
Consisting almost entirely of warehouses and factories, the city's main industries are food service manufacturing, metalworking, and manufacture of glass and plastic equipment. Housing is owned by the city and its few residents are employed within the city limits. There are approximately 46,000 direct and 54,000 indirect mostly skilled workers employed by business within the City of Vernon. Food companies in Vernon include Bon Appetit Bakery, Papa Cantella's Sausages Company, Core-Mark, F. Gaviña & Sons Inc, Newport Meat, J & J Snack Foods, Overhill Farms, Pacific American Fish Company, Red Chamber Co., and Tapatío Foods. Apparel companies in Vernon include 7 for All Mankind, BCBG Max Azria, Lucky Brand Jeans, and True Religion. The city is also home to rendering plants, smelters and metalworking companies. Vernon has a $4.5 billion private employer payroll.

Vernon is primarily industrial, with very few residents, and so has several singular city services. Vernon is one of 57 jurisdictions in the United States with a Class 1-rated fire department and one of four cities in California with its own health department that specializes in industrial issues. It has a police force, municipally owned housing for city employees, and a light and power department with rates that were, once, up to 40% lower than those of Southern California Edison and Los Angeles Department of Water and Power. These services are designed for industry. In 1989, Vernon formed a redevelopment agency, which has since invested millions of dollars to develop property within the city to successfully attract and retain business.

In 2008, the Los Angeles County Economic Development Corporation named Vernon Los Angeles County's "Most Business Friendly City" among cities with less than 50,000 residents. Vernon produces a $250,000,000 flow of revenue every year, much of it from city-owned utilities.

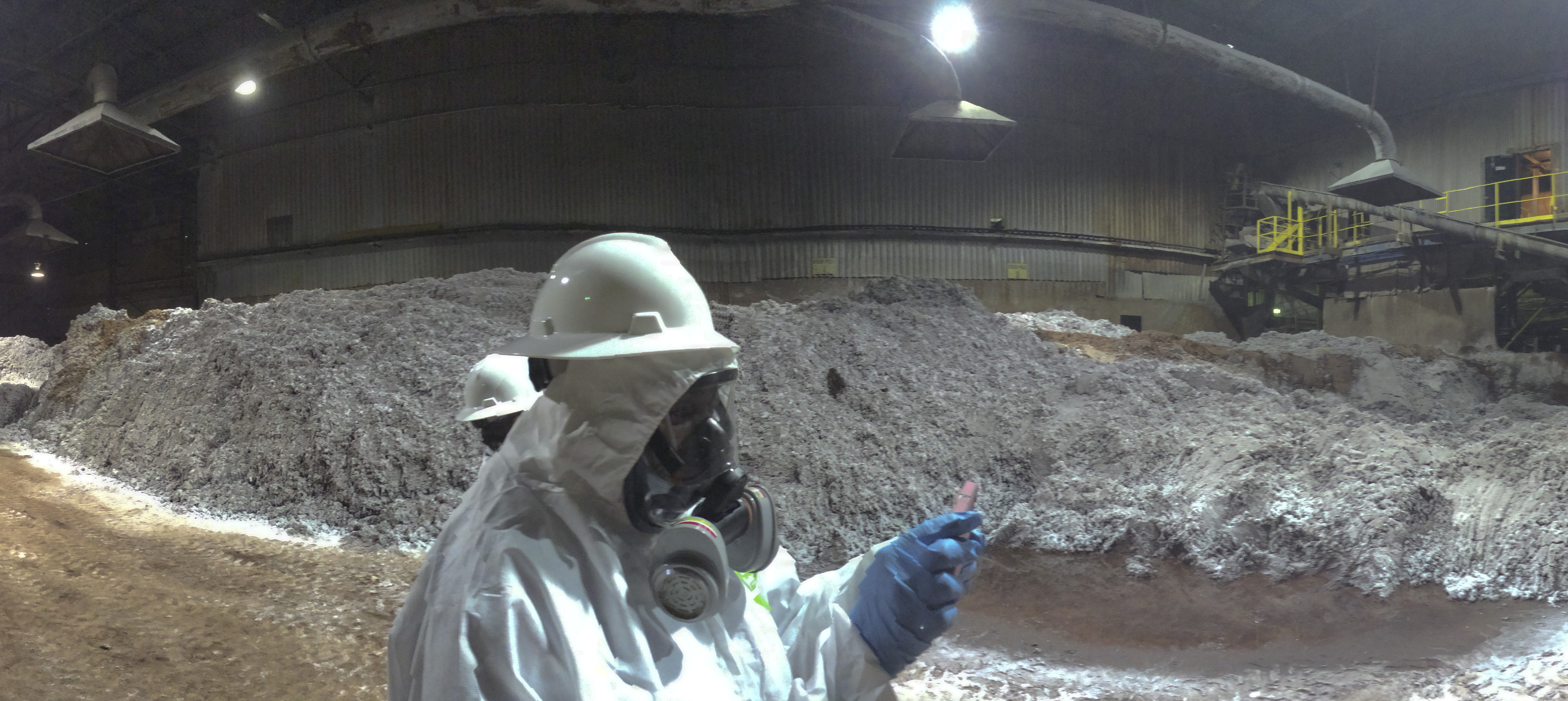
Inspection of slag heap at the Exide facility, April 2014

Lead contamination from the Exide battery recycling plant in Vernon has impacted residents in nearby communities. In March 2015, the facility was permanently shut down by California regulators due to decades-long arsenic and lead leakage and emissions that are expected to require extensive cleanup efforts.

Vernon is also home to the Derby Dolls, a roller derby league that competes regularly.

== Government and infrastructure ==
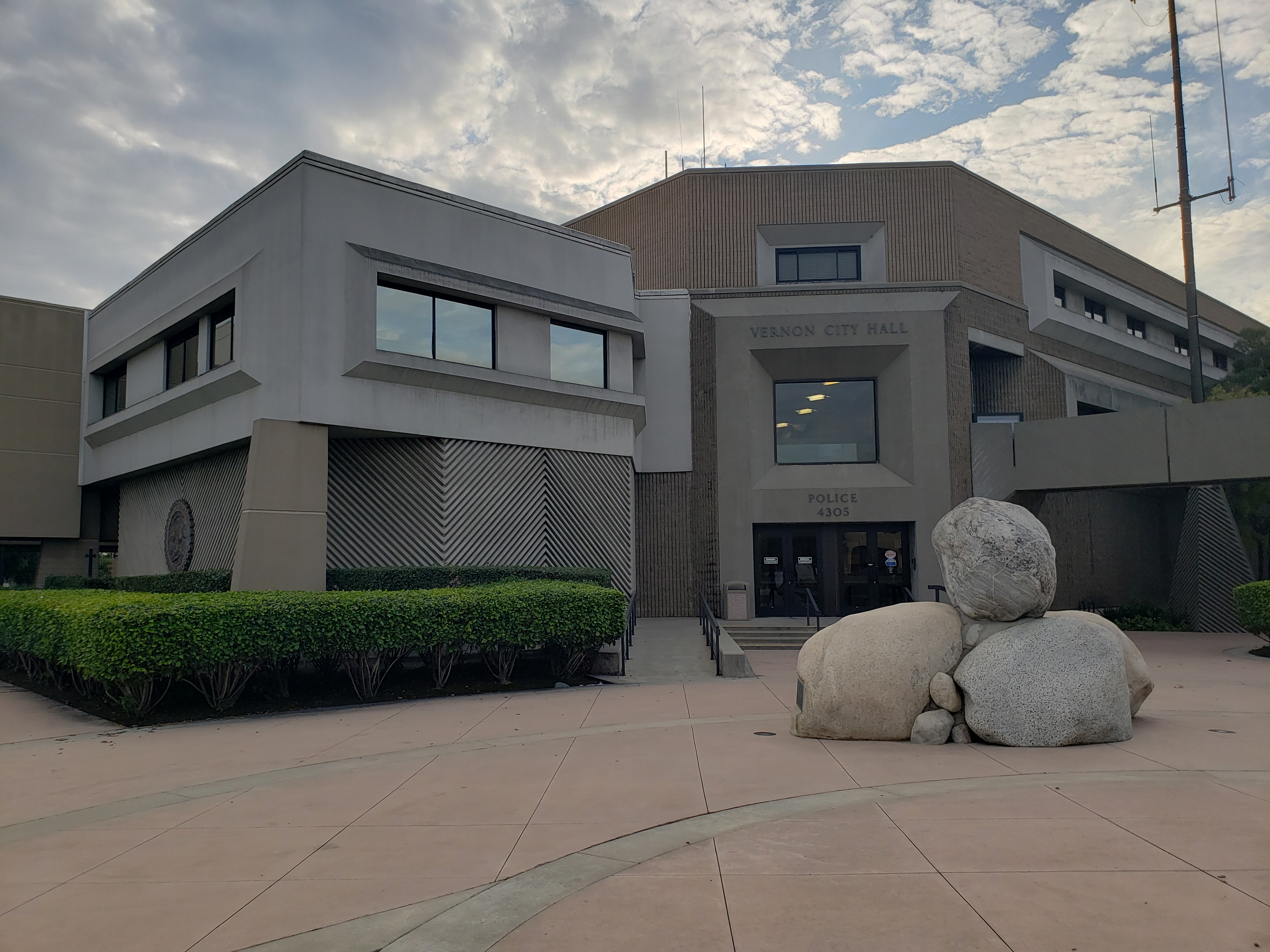
Vernon City Hall

=== County, state, and federal ===
In the Los Angeles County Board of Supervisors, Vernon is in the Fourth District, represented by Janice Hahn.

In the California State Legislature, Vernon is in the 26th senatorial district, represented by Democrat María Elena Durazo, and in the 54th Assembly district, represented by Democrat Mark Gonzalez.

In the United States House of Representatives, Vernon is in California's 42nd congressional district, represented by Democrat Robert Garcia.

Law enforcement services are provided by the Vernon Police Department.

Vernon operates its own Health Department, and is one of four cities in California that have a municipal health department, along with Berkeley, Long Beach, and Pasadena.

In late fall of 2019, the City of Vernon Fire Department (and fire protection services) were transferred to the Los Angeles County Fire Department. The four fire stations that were consolidated—76, 77, 78 and 79—are now Los Angeles County Fire Stations 13 & 52.

The United States Postal Service Vernon Post Office is located at 5121 Hampton Street.

== Churches ==
- Fellowship Community Church of L.A. (Southern Baptist Convention)
- Holy Angels Parish of The Deaf (Roman Catholic)
- St. John Bosco Catholic Church

== Education ==
Vernon is within the Los Angeles Unified School District. The closest public schools are:

- Vernon City Elementary School (within the city limits)
- Holmes Ave Elementary School
- George Washington Carver Middle School
- Gage Middle School
- Huntington Park High School

== Notable people ==
- Beulah Woodard (1895–1955), sculptor
- Jimmy Murphy (1894–1924), racecar driver and 1922 Indianapolis 500 champion

== See also ==
- 38th Street gang
- Green Island, New York
- New Rome, Ohio, village was legally dissolved due to internal corruption of local government.
