= Los Angeles McCormicks =

- 1910; Los Angeles, California

Minor league affiliations
- Class: Class D (1910)
- League: Southern California Trolley League (1910)

Major league affiliations
- Team: None

Minor league titles
- League titles (0): None

Team data
- Name: Los Angeles McCormicks (1910)
- Ballpark: Maier Park (1910)

The Los Angeles McCormicks were a minor league baseball team based in Los Angeles, California. In 1910, the Los Angeles McCormicks played as members of the Class D level Southern California Trolley League. The league folded during the 1910 season. The Los Angeles McCormicks were owned by Jim McCormick, who also owned the Los Angeles Maiers franchise in the league. The two teams shared Maier Park.

== History ==
The 1910 Southern California Trolley League was organized by James McCormick and Ed Crolic. Jim McCormick owned a local pool hall and had previously owned and managed a local team called "McCormick's Shamrocks," who played in numerous exhibition games. Ed Crolic would be the league secretary and become a manager in the California Trolley League, while McCormick served as the league president.

In 1910, the Los Angeles McCormicks became founding members of the Class D level Southern California Trolley League. The McCormicks were one of six charter franchises when the league formed for the 1910 season under league president Jim McCormick, who also owned the McCormicks and Maiers. The franchises from Long Beach, California (Long Beach Clothiers), Los Angeles, California (Los Angeles Maiers), Pasadena, California (Pasadena Silk Sox), Redondo Beach, California (Redondo Beach Wharf Rats and Santa Ana, California (Santa Ana Walnut Growers) joined the McCormicks in League play. The "Trolley" name was in reference to all the league ballparks being accessible for fans via trolley.

On May 1, 1910, newspaper accounts reported that the Los Angeles McCormicks committed 11 errors in a 7–2 loss to Long Beach. On May 3, 1910, the Pasadena Silk Sox and the Los Angeles Maiers folded simultaneously, leaving the league with only four teams. Weeks later, the Southern California Trolley League permanently disbanded on June 13, 1910, with the McCormicks in last place under manager Charlie Harris. At the time the league folded, the Redondo Beach Warf Rats with a 9–2 record were in first place in the California Trolley League Standings, followed by the Santa Ana Yellow Sox Growers (8–3), Long Beach Clothiers (4–5) and Los Angeles McCormicks (2–7) in the final Standings. After the league folded, it was reported that league president and McCormicks' owner Jim McCormick organized a league meeting at his pool hall on South Spring Street for the purpose of settling the league's remaining business.

== The ballpark ==
The Los Angeles McCormicks played 1910 home games at Maier Park. Maier Park, was home of both the Los Angeles Maiers and the Los Angeles McCormicks. The ballpark was built in Vernon, California in 1909 by local brewery owner Pete Maier for his Vernon Tigers, a Pacific Coast League club, who were the primary tenants. In the era, laws prevented alcohol within the city of Los Angeles. Outside the city limits, Maier Park was located directly adjacent to Doyle's Bar, which was advertised as the "longest bar in the world." Doyle's Bar had its own separate public entrance into the ballpark. It was noted that even players used the entrance to the bar in between innings.

== Year–by–year record ==
Year	Record	Finish	Manager	Notes
1910	2–7	4th	Charlie Harris	League folded June 13

== Notable alumni ==
- Team roster for the 1910 Los Angeles McCormicks is unknown.
