= Sak Yamamoto =

American politician (1914–1997)

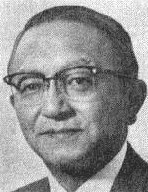
- Sak Yamamoto, mayor of Carson

Mayor of Carson
- In office 1973–1974
- Preceded by: John A. Marbut
- Succeeded by: Gilbert D. Smith
- In office 1977–1979
- Preceded by: John A. Marbut
- Succeeded by: Kay A. Calas

City Council of Carson
- In office 1968–1970
- In office 1972–1979
- Succeeded by: Sylvia L. Muise

Personal details
- Born: Sakae Yamamoto; January 17, 1914 Washington
- Died: June 28, 1997 (age 83)
- Spouse: Greta Yamamoto
- Children: 4

Sakae "Sak" Yamamoto (Japanese: 山本 栄, January 17, 1914 – June 28, 1997) was an American politician who served as the first Asian-American mayor of Carson, California.

== Biography ==
Yamamoto was born on January 17, 1914, in Washington. During World War II, as a Japanese-American, he was interned along with his wife at the Tulare Race Tracks in Tulare, California. After the war, he moved to Addison, Illinois where he was elected to the DuPage County Board of Education. In 1954, he and his family move to Carson, California. He became politically active after he was forced to sell his house for a new school. In 1960, he served on the board of the Dominguez-Carson Fact Finding Committee which determined to incorporate the area as a city. After six prior attempts, on February 6, 1968, a successful vote was made to incorporate and Yamamoto was elected to a two-year term on the City Council along with John A. Marbut, who was named first mayor, John L. Junk, mayor pro tem, Gilbert D. Smith, and H. Rick Clark. He lost his seat in the 1970 election but was re-elected to the City Council in 1972 where he served until 1979. During that period, he was selected as mayor in 1973, 1977, 1978. In February 1979, he helped to secure a new Bridgestone distribution facility in the city. In May 1979, a group denominated Carsonites Organized for Good Government filed a recall petition against Yamamoto and fellow councilman John Marbut for poor leadership, putting the interests of business ahead of the people, and for awarding a new five-year garbage contract to other than the low bidder while also prematurely ending debate. The recall petition was successful. Their political ally, then-mayor Kay Callas, was not recalled although she voted for the contract, she did not support ending debate. Yamamoto was replaced by Sylvia L. Muise and Marbut was replaced by Thomas G. Mills, both were leaders of the recall effort. He filed for re-election to the City Council in 1982 but did not win finishing fourth.

== Personal life ==
He was married to Greta Yamamoto; they had four children: Glen, Karen, Brenda, and Janice. He died on June 28, 1997, and was buried at Green Hills Memorial Park.

He had a cameo appearance as mayor in the 1974 film Gone in 60 Seconds.
