= Redondo Beach Wharf Rats =

- 1910; Redondo Beach, California

Minor league affiliations
- Class: Class D (1910)
- League: Southern California Trolley League (1910)

Major league affiliations
- Team: None

Minor league titles
- League titles (1): 1910

Team data
- Name: Redondo Beach Wharf Rats (1910)
- Ballpark: Unknown (1910)

The Redondo Beach Wharf Rats were a minor league baseball team based in Redondo Beach, California. In 1910, the Wharf Rats played as members of the short– lived Class D level Southern California Trolley League, winning the championship in the league's only season of play.

== History ==
Minor league baseball was first hosted in Redondo Beach, California in 1910, as Redondo Beach had a championship team in a shortened season. The Redondo Beach "Wharf Rats" became founding members of the Class D level Southern California Trolley League. The team nickname is also listed in some references as the "Sand Dabs." Redondo Beach was one of six charter franchises when the league formed for the 1910 season under league president Jim McCormick. The Redondo Beach Wharf Rats joined the franchises from Long Beach, California (Long Beach Clothiers), Los Angeles, California (Los Angeles McCormicks and Los Angeles Maiers), Pasadena, California (Pasadena Silk Sox) and Santa Ana, California (Santa Ana Walnut Growers) to form the league.

The "Trolley" league name was in reference to all the league franchises, Redondo Beach included, being located in the greater Los Angeles, California area, where the league ballparks were accessible via trolley.

When Redondo Beach and the Southern California Trolley League began play in 1910, games were scheduled only on Sundays, with play to continue all year. The Wharf Rats officially began play on April 3, 1910 under manager George Love.

As the season progressed, both the Santa Ana Walnut Growers and Redondo Beach were the top league teams. After three weeks of play, both teams had 3–0 records, after seven weeks they were both 6–1 and after ten weeks they were tied with 8–2 records. In week eleven, the two teams met and Redondo Beach ended the tie in the standings, defeating Santa Ana by the score of 8–2. This was the final week of league play.

The Southern California Trolley League had franchises that faced immediate financial difficulty when play began. On May 3, 1910, the Pasadena Silk Sox and the Los Angeles Maiers franchises folded simultaneously, leaving the league reduced to four teams. On June 13, 1910, the entire Southern California Trolley League permanently disbanded. At the time the league folded, the Redondo Beach Warf Rats with a 9–2 record were in 1st place in the California Trolley League Standings. Redondo Beach was followed by the Santa Ana Yellow Sox Growers (8–3), Long Beach Clothiers (4–5) and Los Angeles McCormicks (2–7) in the final Standings. Pitcher Tommy Ybarrondo of Redondo Beach led the league with 5 wins in the shortened season. After the league folded, it was reported that league president Jim McCormick organized a league meeting at his pool hall on South Spring Street for the purpose of settling the league's affairs.

Redondo Beach has not hosted another minor league franchise. Today, the "Wharf Rats" moniker was adopted by Redondo Beach select youth teams and a vintage baseball team.

== The ballpark ==
The name of the 1910 Redondo Beach Wharf Rats' home ballpark is not directly referenced. In 1911, the Boston Red Sox held their spring training in Redondo Beach for one season. The Red Sox were housed at the Hotel Redondo and used a new, "hastily constructed" ballpark for their training and games. The team began spring training on February 24, 1911.

== Year–by–year record ==
Year	Record	Finish	Manager	Notes
1910	9–2	1st	George Love	League champions League folded June 13

== Notable alumni ==
- Player roster information for the 1910 Redondo Beach team is unknown.
