= Southern California Trolley League =

Minor league baseball league

- Classification: Class D (1910)
- Sport: Minor League Baseball
- Founder: James McCormick; Ed Crolic
- First season: 1910
- Folded: June 13, 1910
- President: James McCormick (1910)
- No. of teams: 6
- Country: United States of America
- Most titles: 1 Redondo Beach Wharf Rats (1910)
- Related competitions: Southern California League

The Southern California Trolley League was a short–lived minor league baseball league played in the 1910 season. The Class D level, six–team Southern California Trolley League consisted of franchises based in California. With all the league teams located in the greater Los Angeles area, teams and fans could access the league ballparks via trolley, leading to the league name. The Southern California Trolley League permanently folded before completing the 1910 season.

== History ==
The Southern California Trolley League was founded in 1910 by James McCormick and Ed Crolic. Jim McCormick owned a pool hall and had owned and managed a local team called McCormick's Shamrocks, who played in numerous exhibition games in the Los Angeles area. Ed Crolic would be the league secretary and become a manager of the Santa Ana club in the Southern California Trolley League, while McCormick served as the league president.

The Southern California Trolley League was formed for the 1910 season as a six–team Class D minor league under the direction of league president Jim McCormick. The 1910 Southern California Trolley League began play hosting franchises from Long Beach, California (Long Beach Clothiers), Los Angeles, California (Los Angeles McCormicks and Los Angeles Maiers), Pasadena, California (Pasadena Silk Sox), Redondo Beach, California (Redondo Beach Wharf Rats) and Santa Ana, California (Santa Ana Walnut Growers). The Los Angeles Maiers were named for a local brewery and the Los Angeles MCormicks were named for their owner. Both Los Angeles teams played home games at Maier Park, sharing it with the Vernon Tigers of the Pacific Coast League.

With all the league franchises being located in the greater Los Angeles area, the ballparks were accessible via trolley, leading to the league name.

Maier Park, home of both the Los Angeles Maiers and Los Angeles McCormicks, had been built in Vernon, California in 1909 by local brewery owner Pete Maier for his Vernon Tigers, a Pacific Coast League club, who were the primary tenants. In an era where laws prevented alcohol within the city of Los Angeles, Maier Park was located directly adjacent to Doyle's Bar, which was advertised as the "longest bar in the world." Doyle's Bar had its own separate public entrance into the ballpark. It was noted that even players used the entrance to the bar in between innings.

When the Southern California Trolley League was formed, it had the intent to schedule games only on Sundays and play year around. Playing once a week, teams needed few pitchers on their roster. The Southern California Trolley League officially began play on April 3, 1910. As an enticement for fans to attend an early season game in Santa Ana, it was noted that a civic leader would bring a goat to the game. After three weeks, both Santa Ana and Redondo Beach had 3–0 records, after seven weeks they were both 6–1 and after ten weeks they were tied with 8–2 records. In week eleven, Redondo Beach ended the tie in the standings and beat Santa Ana 8–2. This was the final week of league play.

The Southern California Trolley League struggled on and off the field. On May 1, 1910, game notes indicated the Los Angeles McCormicks committed 11 errors in a 7–2 loss to Long Beach.

On May 3, 1910, both the Los Angeles Maiers (1–3) and Pasadena Silk Sox (0–4) franchises folded. On June 13, 1910, the entire Southern California Trolley League disbanded. On the date the league folded, the Redondo Beach Wharf Rats were in first place with a 9–2 record, followed by the Santa Ana Walnut Growers (8–3), Long Beach Clothiers (4–5) and Los Angeles McCormicks (2–7).

After the league folded, President Jim McCormick organized a league meeting at his pool hall on South Spring Street for the purpose of settling the league's affairs. It was decided that some of the teams would possibly play independently in the future.

== 1910 Southern California Trolley League teams ==
Team name	City represented	Ballpark	Year(s) active
Long Beach Clothiers	Long Beach, California	Belmont Park Grounds	1910
Los Angeles Maiers	Los Angeles, California	Maier Park	1910
Los Angeles McCormicks	Los Angeles, California	Maier Park	1910
Pasadena Silk Sox	Pasadena, California	Unknown	1910
Redondo Beach Wharf Rats	Redondo Beach, California	Unknown	1910
Santa Ana Walnut Growers	Santa Ana, California	Hawley Park	1910

== Standings & statistics ==
1910 Southern California Trolley League

Team standings	W	L	PCT	GB	Managers
Redondo Beach Wharf Rats	9	2	.818	–	George Love
Santa Ana Walnut Growers	8	3	.727	1	Ed Crolic
Long Beach Clothiers	4	5	.444	4	S.J. Abrams
Los Angeles McCormicks	2	7	.222	6	Harris
Los Angeles Maiers	1	3	.250	NA	NA
Pasadena Silk Sox	0	4	.000	NA	Joe Judge / Frank Abbott

Los Angeles Maiers & Pasadena folded May 3.
League folded June 13.

Player statistics
Player	Team	Stat	Tot	Player	Team	Stat	Tot
Chief Encoe	Long Beach	BA	.429	Tommy Ybarrondo	Redondo Beach	W	5
Eddie Teck	Santa Ana	Runs	9	Myers	Long Beach	SO	50
Chief Encoe	Long Beach	Hits	12	Tommy Ybarrondo	Redondo Beach	PCT	.833 5–1
