= George Cobb (baseball) =

American baseball player (1865–1926)

- Pitcher
- Born: September 25, 1865; Independence, Iowa, U.S.
- Died: August 19, 1926 (aged 60); Pomona, California, U.S.
- Batted: Unknown Threw: Left

MLB debut
- April 15, 1892, for the Baltimore Orioles

Last MLB appearance
- October 13, 1892, for the Baltimore Orioles

MLB statistics
- Win–loss record: 10-37
- Strikeouts: 159
- Earned run average: 4.86
- Stats at Baseball Reference

Teams
- Baltimore Orioles (1892)

George Woodworth Cobb (September 25, 1865 – August 19, 1926) was an American professional baseball player who played pitcher in the Major Leagues in 1892. Cobb played for the Baltimore Orioles.
