= Los Angeles Maiers =

- 1910; Los Angeles, California

Minor league affiliations
- Class: Class D (1910)
- League: Southern California Trolley League (1910)

Major league affiliations
- Team: None

Minor league titles
- League titles (0): None

Team data
- Name: Los Angeles Maiers (1910)
- Ballpark: Maier Park (1910)

The Los Angeles Maiers were a minor league baseball team based in Los Angeles, California. In 1910, the Maiers played as members of the Class D level Southern California Trolley League. The team and the league folded during the 1910 season. The Maiers hosted minor league home games at Maier Park, sharing the ballpark with the fellow league member Los Angeles McCormicks, as both teams were owned by Jim McCormick.

== History ==
The 1910 Southern California Trolley League was organized by James McCormick and Ed Crolic. Jim McCormick owned a local pool hall and had owned and managed a local team called "McCormick's Shamrocks," who played in numerous exhibition games. Ed Crolic would be the league secretary and become a manager in the California Trolley League, while McCormick served as the league president.

In 1910, the Los Angeles Maiers became charter members of the Class D level Southern California Trolley League. The Maiers were one of six charter franchises when the league formed for the 1910 season under league president Jim McCormick, who also owned the Los Angeles McCormicks. The franchises from Long Beach, California (Long Beach Clothiers), Los Angeles, California (Los Angeles McCormicks), Pasadena, California (Pasadena Silk Sox), Redondo Beach, California (Redondo Beach Wharf Rats and Santa Ana, California (Santa Ana Walnut Growers) joined the Maiers in League play. The "Trolley" name was in reference to all the league ballparks were accessible for fans via trolley.

The "Maiers" team moniker corresponds with the owner of the team and the local Maier Brewery. The team's ballpark, Maier Park was also owned by Pete Maier, who owned the Vernon Tigers baseball team.

On May 3, 1910, the Pasadena Silk Sox and the Los Angeles Maiers folded simultaneously, leaving the league with only four teams. The Maiers had a record of 1–3 when the team folded. Shortly after, the entire Southern California Trolley League permanently disbanded on June 13, 1910. At the time the league folded, the Redondo Beach Warf Rats with a 9–2 record were in first place in the California Trolley League Standings, followed by the Santa Ana Yellow Sox Growers (8–3), Long Beach Clothiers (4–5) and Los Angeles McCormicks (2–7) in the final Standings. After the league folded, it was reported that league president and McCormicks' owner Jim McCormick organized a league meeting at his pool hall on South Spring Street for the purpose of settling the league's affairs.

== Maier Park ==
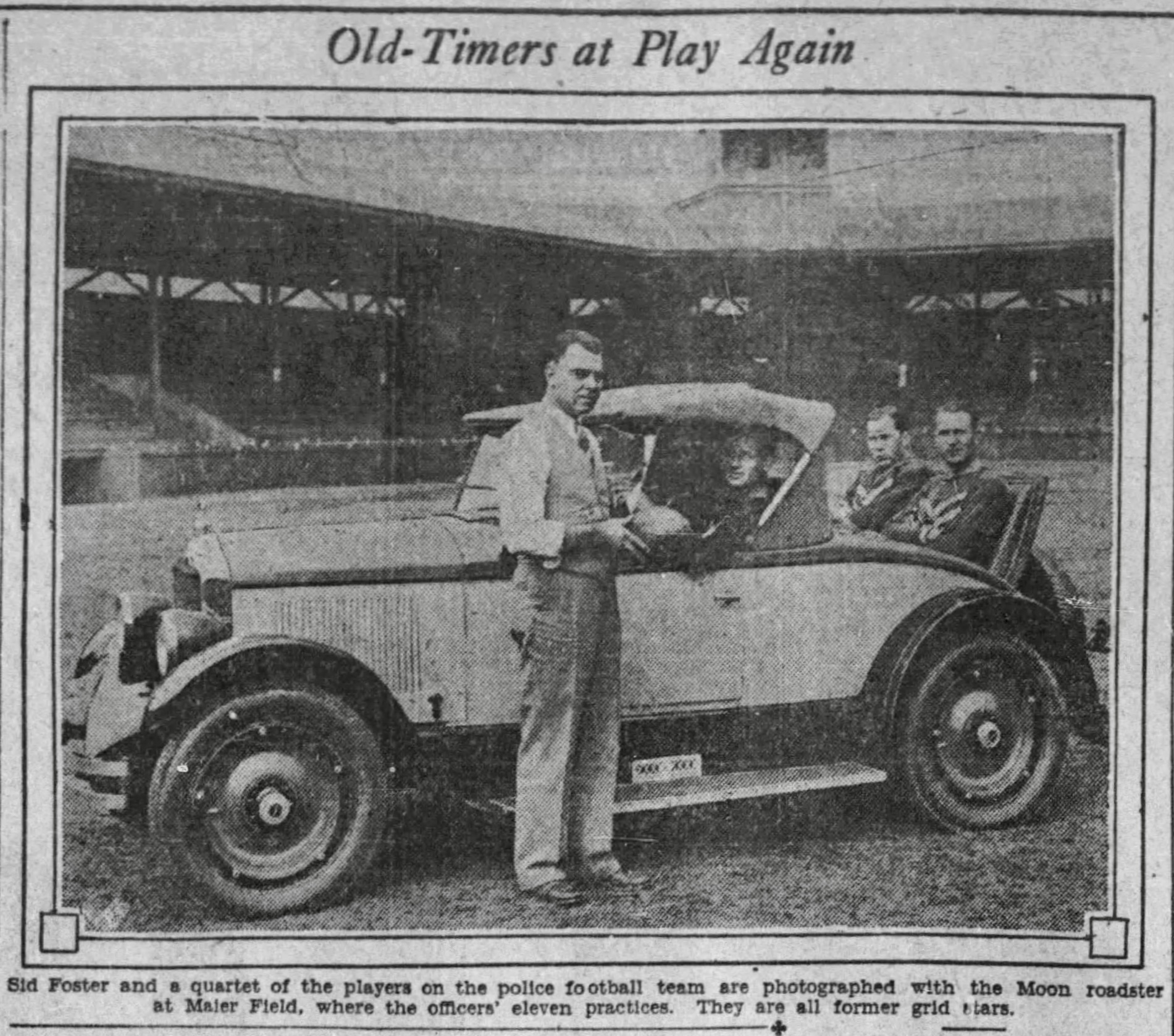
LAPD football team players photographed at Maier Park for an automobile ad, January 1927

The Los Angeles Maiers played 1910 home games at Maier Park. Maier Park, was home of both the Los Angeles Maiers and the Los Angeles McCormicks. The ballpark was built in Vernon, California in 1909 by local brewery owner Pete Maier for his Vernon Tigers, a Pacific Coast League club, who were the primary tenants. In the era, laws prevented alcohol within the city of Los Angeles. Outside the city limits, Maier Park was located directly adjacent to Doyle's Bar, which was advertised as the "longest bar in the world." Doyle's Bar had its own separate public entrance into the ballpark. It was noted that even players used the entrance to the bar in between innings.

Maier Park had a seating capacity of 4,000 and was a wooden ballpark, which was dismantled after the 1915 season. Maier Park was located at East 38th Street and Santa Fe Avenue in Vernon, California.

== Year–by–year record ==
Year	Record	Finish	Manager	Notes
1910	1–3	NA	Unknown	Team folded May 3

== Notable alumni ==
Roster information for the 1910 Los Angeles Maiers is not known.

== See also ==
- Vernon Arena
