= Kitty Brashear =

American baseball player (1877–1934)

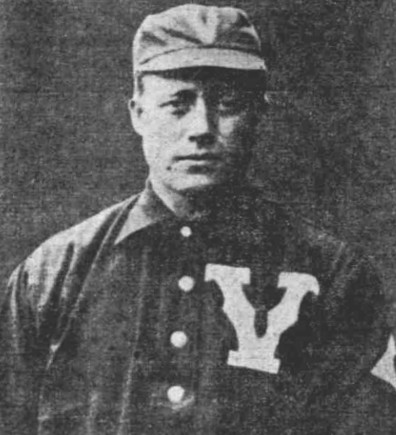
- Pitcher
- Born: August 27, 1877; Mansfield, Ohio, U.S.
- Died: December 22, 1934 (aged 57); Los Angeles, California, U.S.
- Batted: Right Threw: Right

MLB debut
- June 25, 1899, for the Louisville Colonels

Last MLB appearance
- July 30, 1899, for the Louisville Colonels

MLB statistics
- Win–loss record: 1-0
- Earned run average: 4.50
- Strikeouts: 5
- Stats at Baseball Reference

Teams
- Louisville Colonels (1899)

Norman Cobb "Kitty" Brashear (August 27, 1877 – December 22, 1934) was an American pitcher in Major League Baseball for the 1899 Louisville Colonels.

He played in the minor leagues through 1915. His brother, Roy Brashear, also played Major League baseball.
