= Leonis C. Malburg =

American politician and convicted felon

Mayor of Vernon, California
- In office 1974–2009

Member of the Vernon City Council
- In office 1956–2009

Personal details
- Born: April 4, 1929
- Died: November 1, 2017 (aged 88)
- Education: Woodbury University (BSBA)
- Occupation: Politician and banker
- Known for: Forced to resign for convictions for conspiracy, perjury, and voter fraud

Leonis C. Malburg (April 4, 1929 – November 1, 2017) was an American politician and convicted felon, who served as Mayor of Vernon, California from his election in 1974 until his resignation in 2009. The grandson of the city's co-founder John B. Leonis, and a nephew of Miguel Leonis, Malburg and his wife Dominica were convicted of conspiracy, perjury, and voter fraud in 2009.

Malburg was appointed to the Vernon City Council in 1956, and served until 2009. He was elected mayor in 1974, and served until his convictions forced him to resign in 2009.

== Early life and education ==
Leonis Clos Malburg was born in 1929 to Raymond S. Malburg and Adelina Leonis Jr. at the French Hospital of Los Angeles, in Chinatown, Los Angeles. Malburg's father was a mortuary director from San Francisco who played a prominent role in forensic examinations in the Los Angeles Coroner's Office. Malburg's grandfather, John B. Leonis (J. B.) was a Basque immigrant who with ranchers Thomas and James Furlong founded Vernon, the first exclusively industrial city in the California, in September 1905. His great uncle was Miguel Leonis, a 19th-century Alta California pioneer based at the Leonis Adobe in present-day Calabasas, who owned Rancho El Escorpión and other ranch properties in the western San Fernando Valley and Simi Hills.

Malburg received both public and private education. His early school years were spent at Third Street Elementary and John Burroughs Junior High, both in Los Angeles. While living at his parents house, he also spent time with his grandfather, J. B. Leonis, who had residences in Hancock Park, Los Angeles, and on a working ranch in the Angeles National Forest. J. B. was one of the founders of the City of Vernon. In its early days, Vernon was noted for its sporting events, including professional boxing and baseball and the 'world's longest bar' at Jack Doyle's Saloon located on land leased from J. B. Leonis. J. B. served for 45 years as a Vernon city councilmember. He was also the founder and president of the First Citizens Bank of Vernon. Malburg's relationship with his grandfather influenced him to pursue a banking career and Vernon city politics.

In 1943, Malburg was accepted to and attended the Harvard Military Academy in Los Angeles. He was regarded for his shooting skills and graduated a two-time champion in rifle marksmanship.

After returning from his service in the U.S. Air Force, Malburg attended Woodbury University in Los Angeles and majored in Business Administration. He was later on Woodbury's board of trustees. He and his wife made a donation for the naming of the Malburg Atrium in the business school building.

== Career ==
=== Banking ===
Malburg began his banking career as a messenger for First National Bank of Vernon, which was chartered in 1919. He rose within the bank to oversee loans for construction projects and eventually became the bank's vice president. In 1956, he became the president of First National Bank. When, through a merger, First National became Citizens National Bank, and Malburg stayed on as vice president and chairman of the advisory board. Eventually, Citizens National merged with Crocker National Bank and later with Wells Fargo. Malburg retired from banking to manage his family interests and investments.

He was chairman of the Sanitation District of Los Angeles County., a partnership of 24 independent districts, encompassing 78 cities, which serves nearly 5½ million people in Los Angeles County. The Sanitation Districts build and maintain facilities to manage solid, industrial, and water waste in Los Angeles County. Malburg was also chairman of the Barlow Group, which oversees the operations of the Barlow Respiratory Hospital in Los Angeles.

He was president and lifelong member of the Societe Francaise De Bienfaisance Mutuelle De Los Angeles.

He formerly served as director of the Metropolitan Water District of Southern California (MWD), a consortium of 26 cities and water districts that provide drinking water to six counties in Southern California.

=== Politics ===
Malburg's career in politics began when he accepted an appointment to the Vernon city council following the death of a sitting councilman. After eighteen years on the council, Malburg was elected mayor by the council and served in that capacity until 2009. Under Malburg's leadership, the city had multiplied its surplus while providing businesses within its borders with natural gas service, fiber optic systems, and its own light and power company, with rates up to 40% lower than those outside the city. As mayor, he also oversaw ongoing land development and the city's expanding infrastructure, including a power generation station which bears his name.

In 1978, the mayor and city council made the controversial decision during a labor dispute to dismiss striking firefighters who refused to report for duty or take acting positions on fire calls. It was the opinion of city leaders that the firefighters' illegal actions, which came after their union rescinded its agreement to a solution brokered by a state mediator, left the city with a dangerously thin line of fire defense. Superior Court Judge Harry L. Hupp upheld the city's decision in his October, 1978, ruling that the firefighter's strike was indeed illegal. However, after four days of negotiations with the union, the city reinstated the dismissed firefighters. Still, the L.A. County Board of Supervisors, responding to political pressure from labor unions seeking retaliation for the initial firings, canceled its mutual aid agreement with the City of Vernon (a move that was criticized by the president of the 40-member Independent Cities of Los Angeles County Association).

The county district attorney's office also charged Malburg and other administrators with crimes unrelated to the strike. In Malburg's case, the district attorney office accused the mayor of falsely declaring his domicile to be the family residence he built in Vernon, charging that his true domicile was the Los Angeles home he inherited from his grandfather. In 1979, Judge William Keene dismissed the charges when it was revealed that the district attorney's office had withheld evidence from the grand jury which directly contradicted the prosecution's claims.

Similar charges were filed again, twenty-seven years later, after the city attempted to suppress a report by a city attorney that the city administrator was stealing from the city. In the course of that investigation the District Attorney's new Public Integrity Division learned that Malburg and his wife and son all claimed to live in apartments within an office building in Vernon. The city's attempt to suppress the report was unsuccessful and the city administrator, Bruce Malkenhorst Sr., was charged with misappropriating public funds. The mayor and his family were charged with voter fraud.

Leonis's son, John Malburg, was sent to prison for child molestation discovered during the same investigation.

After being sued by the City of Vernon over nearly $1.5 million in attorney fees, Malburg resigned the office of mayor on July 1, 2009.

In December 2009, Leonis Malburg and his wife were convicted of conspiracy, perjury, and voter fraud. In January 2010, they were sentenced to probation and ordered to pay over $600,000 in restitution and fines. Both the Supreme Court of California and the Supreme Court of the United States denied appeals of their sentences.
