= Albert T. Robles =

Albert T. Robles is an American politician and former mayor, councilman, treasurer, and deputy city manager for the City of South Gate, California. In 2005, he was convicted of corruption and sentenced to 10 years in federal prison.

== Political career ==
Robles graduated from the University of California Los Angeles and became an aide to state legislator Marguerite Archie-Hudson. In 1992, he was elected to the South Gate City Council by a predominantly Mexican-American electorate and became the city's youngest mayor at age 26. In 2002, Robles was appointed by the City Council to the Deputy City Manager position. In 2003, Robles was recalled along with Mayor Xochitl Ruvalcaba, Vice Mayor Raul Moriel, and Councilwoman Maria Benavides in an election that was monitored by Los Angeles County by order of Governor Gray Davis. Robles retained his position as Deputy City Manager. In 2005, he was convicted on federal corruption charges then sentenced the following year to 10 years in prison.

== Criminal charges and conviction ==
In a 1998 interview with The Los Angeles Times, Robles revealed that years earlier while he was working as a community coordinator for Assemblymember Marguerite Archie-Hudson, she predicted that he was "either going to end up in prison or the governor’s mansion".

Robles was accused of making threatening statements to State Senator Martha Escutia and Assemblyman Marco Firebaugh. He was tried in 2002 but all charges were dismissed when the jury deadlocked on all counts. His attorney argued that his statements were merely the kind of language typical of South Gate politicians and not literal threats.

Robles was indicted on federal corruption charges in 2004. This stemmed from his award of contracts worth millions to friends and business associates as well as funneling money through the awarded contracts to himself and family members. He was found guilty of 30 counts of bribery, money laundering, and depriving the electorate. He was sentenced to 10 years in federal prison and ordered to pay the city of South Gate $639,000 in restitution.
