= Jesse Stovall =

American baseball player (1875–1955)

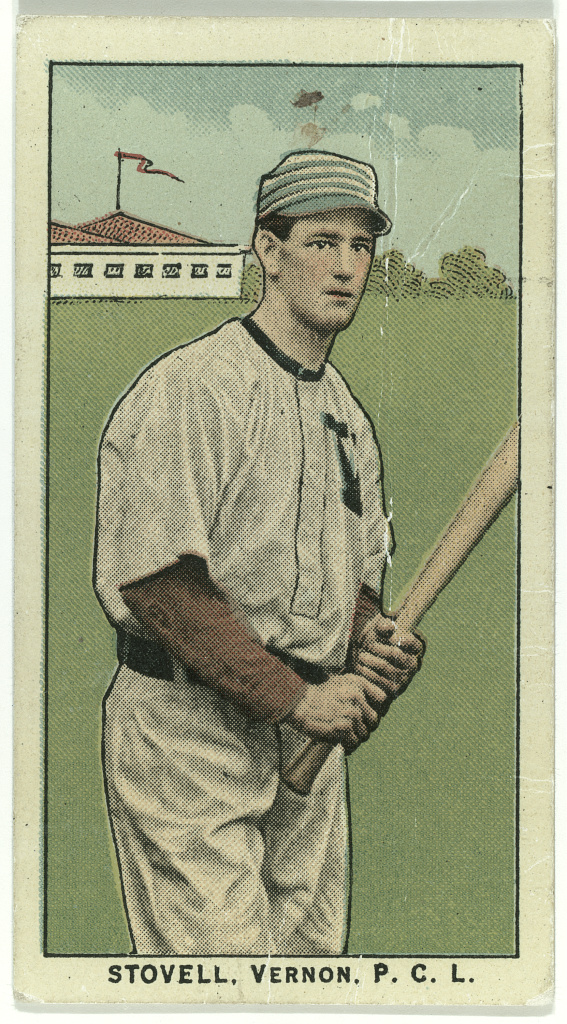
- Pitcher
- Born: July 24, 1875; Leeds, Missouri, U.S.
- Died: July 12, 1955 (aged 79); San Diego, California, U.S.
- Batted: Left Threw: Right

MLB debut
- August 31, 1903, for the Cleveland Naps

Last MLB appearance
- October 7, 1904, for the Detroit Tigers

MLB statistics
- Win–loss record: 7–14
- Earned run average: 3.26
- Strikeouts: 53
- Stats at Baseball Reference

Teams
- Cleveland Naps (1903); Detroit Tigers (1904)

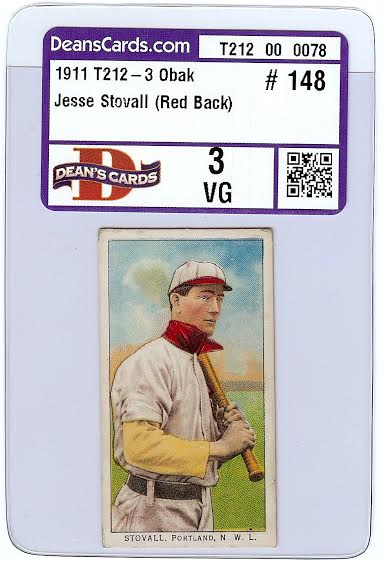
Jesse Stovall - Baseball Card

Jesse Cramer Stovall (July 24, 1875 – July 12, 1955) was an American Major League Baseball pitcher who played for two seasons. He played for the Cleveland Naps in 1903 and the Detroit Tigers in 1904, pitching in 28 career games. His younger brothers, George Stovall (1877–1951) and Samuel Woodson Stovall (1881–1924), were also baseball players.

== Personal ==
Jesse Stovall and his 1st wife Dorothy Evangeline Klapp (1884–1981) were married in Seattle, WA on February 25, 1904. The couple had 1 child, Margaret Etta Stovall (1907–1999) and were divorced in Reno, NV in 1914.

It is unknown when Jesse married second wife Bonnie Ethel Erickson (1888–1955).

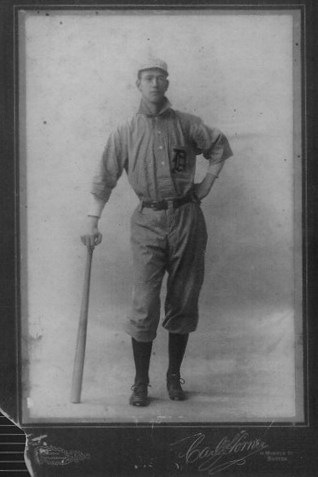
Jesse Stovall

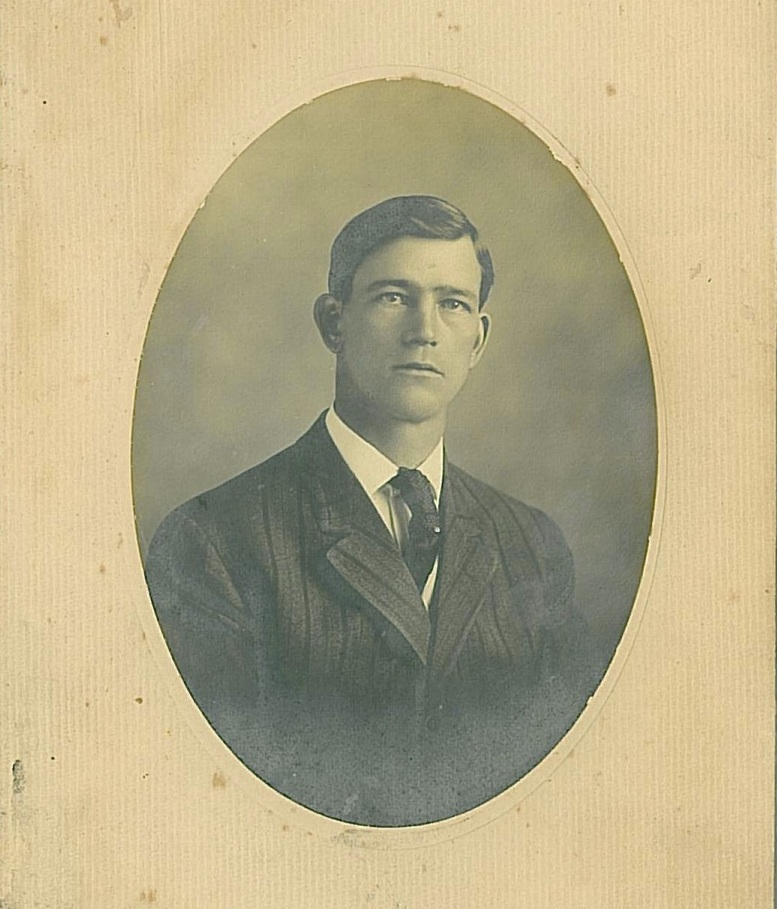
Jesse Stovall
