= Bull Durham (pitcher) =

American baseball player (1877–1960)

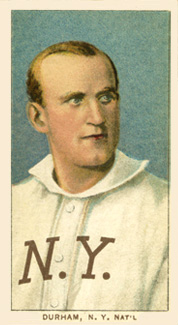
- Pitcher
- Born: June 27, 1877; New Oxford, Pennsylvania, U.S.
- Died: June 28, 1960 (aged 83); Bentley, Kansas, U.S.
- Batted: Right Threw: Right

MLB debut
- September 15, 1904, for the Brooklyn Superbas

Last MLB appearance
- May 19, 1909, for the New York Giants

MLB statistics
- Win–loss record: 2-0
- Earned run average: 5.28
- Strikeouts: 6
- Stats at Baseball Reference

Teams
- Brooklyn Superbas (1904); Washington Senators (1907); New York Giants (1908–1909)

Louis Raphael "Bull" Durham (born Louis Raphael Staub; June 27, 1877 – June 28, 1960) was an American pitcher in Major League Baseball. He pitched in two games for the Brooklyn Superbas in 1904, two games for the Washington Senators in 1907 and five games for the New York Giants during 1908 and 1909.

Durham was born in New Oxford, Pennsylvania and grew up in Pennsylvania. After he began playing minor league baseball he got into trouble with the league due to a fight in a bar. He was banned, but found a loophole by changing his name to "Bull Durham", after the Bull Durham Smoking Tobacco brand. Once he finished his baseball career in 1909, he began acting and had roles in several silent films. He died in Bentley, Kansas.
