= Spencer Abbott (baseball) =

Baseball player and manager

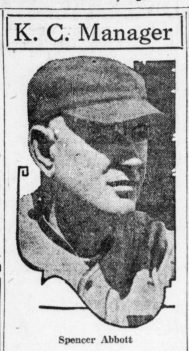

Spencer Arthur Abbott (August 27, 1877 in Chicago – December 18, 1951 in Washington, D.C.) was an American long-time minor league baseball player and manager, as well as a minor league umpire and major league coach and scout.

== Playing career ==
Abbott played the majority of his career from 1901 to 1914, although he did not play in 1902 or 1913. In 1932, at the age of 54, he appeared in one game for the Portland Beavers, the team he was managing at the time, hitting a single. A first baseman for the majority of his career, although he pitched in a few games as well, Abbott hit below .250 with regularity, nearing the Mendoza Line on occasion. He hit over .250 only four times in 14 seasons: 1904 (.287), 1907 (.289), 1912 (.288) and 1932 (1.000).

== Umpiring career ==
He was an umpire for part of the 1915 season in the Western League.

== Managing career ==
Abbott was one of the winningest managers in minor league baseball history, compiling a record of 2,180-2,037 (.517 winning percentage) in a career that spanned from 1903 to 1947. He is fifth all-time in minor league managerial wins.

From 1903 to 1906, Abbott was a player-manager, as he was from 1910 to 1911 and 1914. He did not manage from 1907 to 1909, and 1913 was the first year in which he served as a manager without playing at all. He also did not manage from 1915 to 1918, in 1935, 1944 and 1945.

In 1919 and 1920, he led the Tulsa Oilers to two consecutive Western League championships, and in 1921 he led the Memphis Chicks to a Southern Association league championship as well. In 1932, he led the Portland Beavers to a league championship. The final team he led to a league championship was the Charlotte Hornets, in 1946.

Abbott managed until he was 69 years old.

== Coaching and scouting career ==
He coached for the Washington Senators in 1935 and scouted for them as well.
