= Watsonville Pippins =

- 1898–1913; (1898–1899, 1913); Watsonville, California

Minor league affiliations
- Class: Independent (1898); Class E (1899); Class D (1913)
- League: Pacific Coast League (1898); California League (1899); California State League (1913)

Major league affiliations
- Team: None

Minor league titles
- League titles (0): None

Team data
- Name: Watsonville Babies (1898); Watsonville Hayseeds (1899); Watsonville Pippins (1913)
- Ballpark: Porter's Park (1899); Loma Vista Park (1913)

The Watsonville Pippins were a minor league baseball team based in Watsonville, California. The Pippins played briefly as members of the Class D level California State League in 1913. The Pippins were preceded in minor league play by teams that played partial seasons in two other leagues. The Watsonville "Babies" played briefly at the end of the 1898 Pacific Coast League season and were followed the next season by the Watsonville "Hayseeds" of the 1899 California League, who folded during the season. The Watsonville Pippins hosted 1913 home games at Loma Vista Park.

Baseball Hall of Fame member Frank Chance played for the 1899 Watsonville Hayseeds.

== History ==
Minor league baseball was first hosted in Watsonville, California in 1898. The Watsonville team, called the Watsonville Babes, joined the Independent level Pacific Coast League during the season. On August 14, 1898, Watsonville replaced the Fresno Tigers franchise in league play after Fresno folded with a 5–14 record. Playing under manager Tom Walker, Watsonville compiled a 6–13 record to complete the season.

Baseball Hall of Fame member Frank Chance played for Watsonville in 1898. Chance was playing for Watsonville while attending Washington College and studying dentistry, when he was signed to a major league contract and made his debut with the Chicago Cubs in 1898. Cubs player Bill Lange had seen Chance play and convinced the Cubs to sign him immediately. Chance is noted in the "Tinker to Evers to Chance" poem.

Watsonville continued minor league play in 1899 in a new league. The Watsonville Hayseeds became members of the six–team Class E level California League. The Watsonville franchise was dropped by the league during the season. Watsonville began the season alongside the Oakland Oaks, Sacramento Gilt Edges, San Francisco Wasps, San Jose Brewers and Santa Cruz Beachcombers joining in league play. The 1899 Watsonville team was also referred to as the "Gardiners." On August 28, 1899, the San Jose Brewers franchise folded, and the Watsonville Hayseeds were dropped by the California League to keep an even number of teams. Playing under managers Joe McCarthy, George Harper and Bill Brockhoff, Watsonville finished play with a 25–24 record, as Sacramento won the league championship.

On August 13, 1899, newspapers reported Watsonville defeated Santa Cruz by the score of 8–3 in front of a large home crowd at Porter's Park. Player/manager George Harper was the winning pitcher for Watsonville in the contest.

Minor league baseball returned briefly to Watsonville for a final season in 1913. The Watsonville "Pippins" joined the four–team Class D level California State League during the season. On July 6, 1913, the Vallejo Marines franchise relocated to Watsonville with a 24–33 record.

The Watsonville use of the "Pippins" team moniker corresponds to local industry, history and agriculture. Called the "Apple City," Watsonville, California remains home to many apple orchards and related businesses. By definition, a "pippin" refers to varieties of apples.

In their final season of minor league play, the 1913 Watsonville Pippins compiled a 28–38 record while based in Watsonville to complete the California State League season. The Vallejo/Watsonville team ended the California State League season with an overall record of 52–71 to place third in the final standings. Playing under manager William Devereaux, the team ended the season 27.0 games behind the first place Stockton Producers (79–44) in the final standings. The Vallejo/Watsonville team finished behind the second place Fresno Packers (73–50) and ahead of fourth place San Jose Bears (42–81). Rinaldo Williams of Vallejo/Watsonville led the California State League with 7 home runs.

The Watsonville franchise did not return to the 1914 California State League, replaced in the four–team league by the Modesto Reds. Watsonville, California has not hosted another minor league team.

== The ballparks ==
In 1899, the Watsonville Hayseeds played minor league home games at Porter's Park.

The Watsonville Pippins hosted minor league home games at Loma Vista Park in 1913.

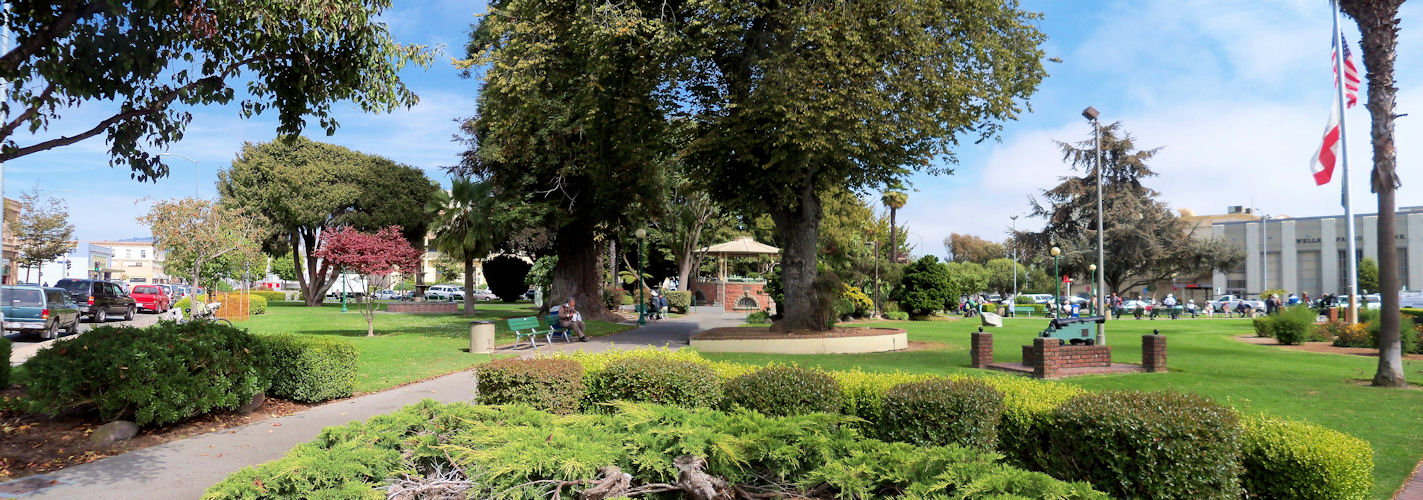
(2012) Watsonville City Plaza. National Register of Historic Places. Watsonville, California.

== Timeline ==
Year(s)	# Yrs.	Team	Level	League	Ballpark
1898	1	Watsonville Babies	Independent	Pacific Coast League	Porter's Park
1899	1	Watsonville Hayseeds	Class E	California League	Porter's Park
1913	1	Watsonville Pippins	Class D	California State League	Loma Vista Park

== Year-by-year records ==
Year	Record	Finish	Manager	Notes
1898	6–13	NA	Tom Walker	replaced Fresno August 14
1899	25–24	NA	Joe McCarthy / George Harper / Bill Brockhoff	Team folded August 28
1913	51–71	3rd	William Devereaux	Vallejo (24–33) moved to Watsonville July 6

== Notable alumni ==
- Frank Chance (1898) Inducted to Baseball Hall of Fame, 1946
- George Borchers (1898)
- Ernie Courtney (1898–1899)
- Ira Davis (1899)
- Mike Donlin (1898)
- George Harper (1899, MGR)
- Ham Iburg (1898)
- Ed Pabst (1899)
- Pete Standridge (1913)
- Rinaldo Williams (1913)

== See also ==
- Watsonville (minor league baseball) players
- Watsonville Hayseeds players
- Watsonville Gardiners players
- Watsonville Pippins players
