= Berkeley Clarions =

- 1910–1911; Berkeley, California

Minor league affiliations
- Class: Class D (1910–1911)
- League: Central California League (1910–1911)

Major league affiliations
- Team: None

Minor league titles
- League titles (0): None

Team data
- Name: Berkeley Clarions (1910–1911)
- Ballpark: Dwight Way Grounds (1910–1911)

The Berkeley Clarions were a minor league baseball team based in Berkeley, California. In the 1910 and 1911 seasons, the Clarions played as members of the Class D level Central California League, with the team playing partial seasons in both years. Berkeley hosted home minor league games at the Dwight Way Grounds.

== History ==
Minor league baseball play was first hosted in Berkeley, California in 1910. The Berkeley team became members of the eight–team Class D level Central California League during the season.

The Central California League began play on April 17, 1910, and played through November 6, 1910. The league played a full schedule, but only the weekend games counted in the standings. Berkeley joined the league as part of a league trend involving franchise relocations. Of the eight Central California League teams that began the 1910 season, seven of those teams moved during the year, with three teams moving twice or more, with three teams disbanding before the end of the season. In all, fifteen different team relocations occurred in 1910, with two cities hosting two different teams during the season.

The 1910 Berkeley team was in three other cities before settling in Berkeley. During the 1910 season, the Santa Rosa Prune Pickers moved to become the Alameda Bracketts on May 5, 1910. Alameda then moved to become the Oakland Basches on July 10, 1910. The team made moved to its fourth city when Oakland moved to Berkeley on July 31, 1910. Playing under managers William Bailey and T. Walton, the team finished in fourth place with 14–15 overall record. In the final standings, the first place Richmond Merchants ended the regular season with a record of 18–10, finishing 1.0 game ahead of the second place Alameda Alerts, who were the second team hosted in Alameda in 1910. Berkeley finished 4½ games behind. In the finals, the Alameda Alerts defeated Richmond 2 games to 0.

In the 1911 Central California League season, Berkeley returned to play, as the Clarions did not relocate. However, two other Central California League teams moved and Berkeley and the Oakland Emery Arms folded during the season, before the league permanently folded on July 9, 1911. After Oakland folded on June 18, 1911, Berkeley folded on June 23, 1911, leading to the demise of the league. The league played a full schedule, but only the weekend games counted in the standings.

After beginning play on April 8, 1911, the league folded on July 9, 1911, with Berkeley officially ending the season in fifth place after folding two weeks earlier. The Clarions had a final record of 5–6, playing under manager Jim Kane. Berkeley finished 3½ games behind the first place San Leandro Cherry Pickers.

Berkeley next hosted minor league baseball in 1915, when the Berkeley team played as members of the Class D level California State League.

The "Berkeley Clarions" nickname was revived by today's Bay Area Vintage Base Ball League team.

== The ballpark ==
The Berkeley Central California League teams hosted home minor league games at the Dwight Way Grounds. The ballpark was located at Derby Street, Carleton Street and Grove Street. Today, the site is still in use as a ballpark, renamed as Tim Moellering Field in 2012. The ballpark is utilized by Berkeley Public Schools athletic teams from Berkeley High School and Berkeley Tech High School.

== Timeline ==
Year(s)	# Yrs.	Team	Level	League	Ballpark
1910–1911	2	Berkeley Clarions	Class D	Central California League	Dwight Way Grounds

== Year–by–year records ==
Year	Record	Finish	Manager	Playoffs/notes
1910	14–15	4th	William Bailey / T. Walton	Santa Rosa moved to Alameda May 5 Alameda moved to Oakland July 10; Oakland moved to Berkeley July 31; Did not qualify
1911	5–6	5th	Jim Kane	Team folded June 23; League folded July 9

== Notable alumni ==
- William Bailey (1910, MGR)
