= Oakland Emery Arms =

- 1911; (1910–1911); Oakland, California

Minor league affiliations
- Class: Class D (1910–1911)
- League: Central California League (1910–1911)

Major league affiliations
- Team: None

Minor league titles
- League titles (0): None

Team data
- Name: Oakland Basches (1910); Oakland Emery Arms (1911)
- Ballpark: Dover Street Park (1910–1911)

The Oakland Emery Arms were a minor league baseball team based in Oakland, California. In 1910 and 1911, Oakland teams played as members of the Class D level Central California League. The 1910 "Oakland Basches" preceded the Emery Arms and played a partial season in the league.

The Oakland teams hosted home Central California League home games at Dover Street Park, which is still in use as a public park.

== History ==
Before Oakland joined the Central California League, the 1909 Oakland Invaders played as members of the California State League, winning the 1909 league championship.

The 1910 Oakland "Basches" began minor league play in the Class D level Central California League during the season. The league franchises were unstable during two seasons of play, with Oakland being no exception. The league began play its first season of play on April 17, 1910, with the schedule ending on November 6, 1910. Eight teams started 1910 league play, with seven of the eight teams moving during the season. Three teams moved twice or more, while three teams disbanded. In all, 15 different sites were used in the 1910 season, with two cities hosting two different Central California League teams.

The eventual Oakland franchise played in four cities during the 1910 season. On May 5, 1910, the Santa Rosa Fruit Pickers began the mobility, when the team moved to Alameda, playing as the Alameda Brackets. On July 10, 1910, Alameda moved to Oakland, where the franchise played as the Oakland Basches. Finally, Oakland moved to Berkley on July 31, 1910.

When the Central California League ended their season on November 6, 1910, the Santa Rosa Prune Pickers/Alameda Bracketts/Oakland Basches/Berkeley team was in fourth place. The team ended the Central California League regular season with a record of 14–15, finishing 4½ games behind the first place Richmond Merchants, as William Bailey and T. Walker served as managers.

The 1911 Oakland "Emery Arms" continued Central California League play after the team was established during the season. On June 4, 1911, the Elmhurst Carroll & Tilden team moved to Oakland. The team then folded in Oakland on June 18, 1910. When the league folded, Oakland had already ended their 1911 season with a record of 4–7, playing under manager George Worthington. After beginning play on April 9, 1911, the Central California League permanently folded on July 9, 1911, with Oakland credited with a sixth place finish. Oakland finished 5.0 games behind the first place San Leandro Cherry Pickers.

The Oakland Oaks of the Class A level Pacific Coast League also played in the 1910 and 1911 seasons. The Oaks played at Freeman's Park.

== The ballpark ==
The Oakland teams hosted 1910 and 1911 home minor league games at Dover Street Park. The ballpark had a capacity of 3,500 with a grandstand. In the era, Dover Street Park was located at Dover Street and Aileen Street in Oakland. Dover Street Park is still in use today as a public park. It is located at 5707 Dover Street in Oakland, California.

== Timeline ==
Year(s)	# Yrs.	Team	Level	League	Ballpark
1910	1	Oakland Basches	Class D	Central California League	Dover Street Park
1911	1	Oakland Emery Arms	Class D	Central California League	Dover Street Park

== Year–by–year records ==
Year	Record	Finish	Manager	Notes
1910	14–15	4th	William Bailey / T. Walker	Santa Rosa moved to Alameda May 5 Alameda moved to Oakland July 10; Oakland moved to Berkley July 31
1911	4–7	6th	George Worthington	Team folded June 18; League folded July 9

== Notable alumni ==
- William Bailey (1910, MGR)
