= Walt Kuhn (baseball) =

American baseball player (1887–1935)

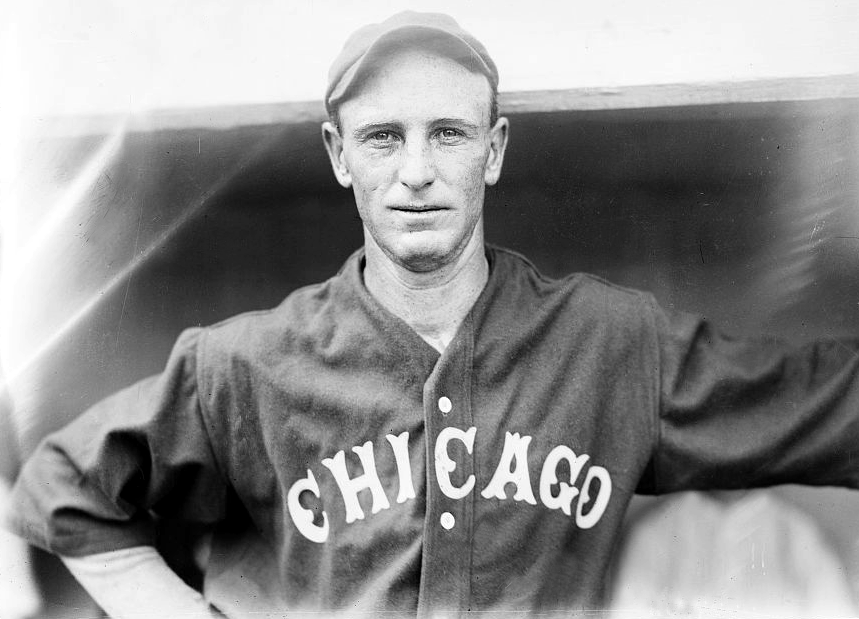
- Catcher
- Born: February 2, 1887; Fresno, California, U.S.
- Died: June 14, 1935 (aged 48); Fresno, California, U.S.
- Batted: Right Threw: Right

MLB debut
- April 18, 1912, for the Chicago White Sox

Last MLB appearance
- September 28, 1914, for the Chicago White Sox

MLB statistics
- Batting average: .205
- Hits: 55
- Runs batted in: 15
- Stats at Baseball Reference

Teams
- Chicago White Sox (1912–1914)

Charles Walter Kuhn (February 2, 1887 – June 14, 1935), known also as "Red" Kuhn, was an American professional baseball player. During his playing career, Kuhn, a catcher, played three seasons in Major League Baseball (MLB) with the Chicago White Sox (1912–1914). Over those three years, he compiled a batting average of .205 with 25 runs scored, 55 hits, nine doubles, and 15 runs batted in (RBIs) in 119 games played. The majority of Kuhn's career was spent in the minor leagues. He played seven seasons in the minors with the Fresno California State League club (1905), San Francisco Orphans (1908), Fresno Tigers/Raisin Growers (1908–1910), Portland Beavers (1911), Oakland Oaks (1915), Salt Lake City Bees (1916), Waco Navigators (1916), and Dallas Giants (1917).

Kuhn was born in Fresno, California, and educated in Louisville, Kentucky. He started is professional career in 1908 at the age of 18. During his playing career, Kuhn stood at 5 feet 7 inches (170 cm) and weighed 162 pounds (73 kg). He broke into the major leagues in 1912. His last MLB season would be 1914. After playing for various minor league clubs, Kuhn was drafted into the United States Armed Forces during World War I. However, Kuhn never saw combat due to the loss of his right eye, which was caused by a prank pulled on him by his roommate during combat training. The injury also meant the end of his professional baseball career. Kuhn died in 1935 in his home-town of Fresno.

== Early life ==
Kuhn was born on February 2, 1887, in Fresno, California to Charles, and Irene of Kentucky, and Iowa, respectively. Charles Kuhn worked as a day laborer in Fresno. Walt Kuhn had a sibling, Roy, who also played professional baseball. Walt Kuhn attended high school in Louisville, Kentucky.

== Professional career ==
=== Early minor league career (1905, 1908–1911) ===
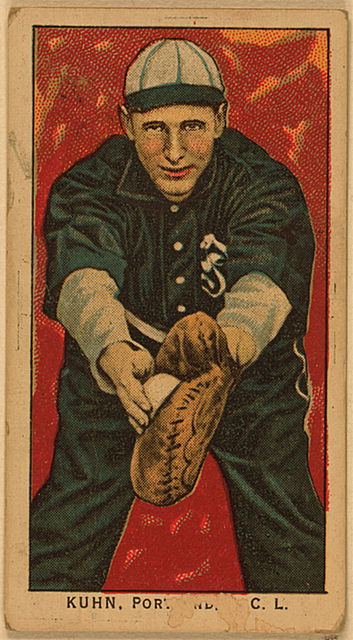
Kuhn played four seasons in the minor leagues before breaking into the majors in 1912.

In 1905, Kuhn joined the minor league Fresno California League club. On that team, he played with former, and future major league players Frank Chance, Roy Hitt, Pete Lohman, Judge Nagle, and Jud Smith. Kuhn's statistics for that season were not kept. For the next two seasons (1907–08), Kuhn would not appear in professional baseball. He returned in 1908 with the minor league San Francisco Orphans, and Fresno Tigers of the independent California League. Combined between the two teams, he batted .264 with 23 hits in 29 games played.

In 1909, Kuhn re-signed with the Fresno club, who changed their name to the Raisin Growers. During the season, his contract was sold to the Minneapolis Millers of the Class-A American Association. However, he was farmed out to the Fresno club for the remainder of the season. Kuhn batted .258 with 119 hits, 23 hits, 23 doubles, and seven home runs in 134 games played. He finished the season tied for fourth in doubles, and tied for fifth in home runs. After the season, it was reported that the Major League Baseball (MLB) New York Highlanders were interested in purchasing Kuhn for the price of US$2,000. However, New York failed to reach an agreement with Fresno.

Kuhn again played with the Fresno California League team in 1910, who changed their name back to the Tigers. In February 1911, Kuhn signed with the Portland Beavers of the Class-A Pacific Coast League. During the final game of the Pacific Coast League Pennant Series, Kuhn hit a home run in the bottom of the ninth inning to give the Beavers the win. On the season with Portland, he batted .228 with 79 hits, 11 doubles, four triples, and two home runs in 120 games played.

=== Chicago White Sox (1912–1914) ===
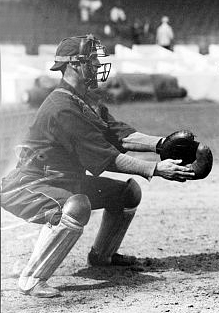
Kuhn was the Chicago White Sox starting catcher at the end of the 1912 season, and the beginning of the 1913 season.

In February 1912, Kuhn signed with the MLB Chicago White Sox. He attended spring training with the White Sox that season. Billy Sullivan, Chicago's starting catcher at the time, stated that Kuhn would be a successful major league player. Kuhn made his MLB debut on April 18, 1912, against the St. Louis Browns. In August, Kuhn was given the job of starting catcher for the White Sox. In his first major league season, he batted .202 with 16 runs scored, 36 hits, seven doubles, 10 runs batted in (RBIs), and four stolen bases in 76 games played. He finished the season fifth in the American League in defensive games as a catcher (75); and tied for fifth with Eddie Ainsmith, Oscar Stanage, and Ed Sweeney in passed balls (9).

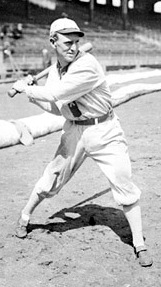
Kuhn spent three seasons in Major League Baseball, all with the Chicago White Sox.

At the start of the 1913 season, Kuhn was given the Chicago White Sox's starting catcher job. In August, he lost his starting job to the White Sox new catcher, Ray Schalk. Towards the end of the season, Kuhn injured his arm, which caused him to miss playing time. With Chicago that season, Kuhn batted .160 with five runs scored, eight hits, one doubles, and five RBIs in 26 games played. After the season, he stated that he wanted to return to the Pacific Coast League and play with the San Francisco Seals.

Kuhn re-signed with the Chicago White Sox in February 1914, despite his previous statement in which he said he would like to return to the Pacific Coast League. In March, during a spring training game, Kuhn seriously injured his right hand. It was reported that he would not be able to resume playing with the White Sox until the start of the season. The hand injury was later described as a cracked right index finger. In July, it was reported that Kuhn was traded to the Milwaukee Brewers in exchange for Larry Chappell. However, Kuhn played with the White Sox for the entire season. His last MLB appearance would come on September 28, 1914. On the season, he batted .275 with four runs scored, 11 hits, one double, and two RBIs in 17 games played. Over his major league career, Kuhn is currently 81st in the all-time caught stealing percentage ranking (45.54%).

=== Later minor league career (1915–1917) ===
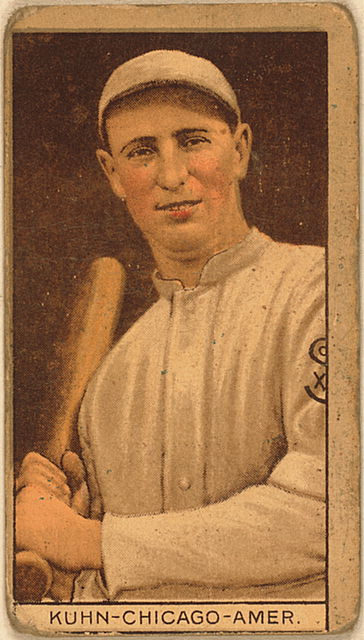
After his three seasons in the majors, Kuhn played three seasons in the minors.

On March 29, 1915, Kuhn was sold to the Oakland Oaks of the Double-A Pacific Coast League. Kuhn arrived in Oakland the day after being sold and immediately entered a practice with the Oaks. During the season, he was the Oaks back-up catcher, and first baseman. In August, Kuhn took over for the Oaks every-day catcher, Rowdy Elliott, who was also serving as Oakland's manager. Elliot commented that Kuhn was "a first-class marksman". However, earlier in the season there were reports that the two catchers were feuding in the clubhouse. With the Oaks that season, Kuhn batted .236 with 86 hits, 17 doubles, and one triple in 126 games played.

Kuhn signed with the independent Modesto Reds in 1916. Later that season, Kuhn signed with the Double-A Salt Lake City Bees of the Pacific Coast League. In just two games, he got one hit in three at-bats. He then signed with the Class-B Waco Navigators of the Texas League. With Waco, he batted .274 with 49 hits, and four doubles in 72 games played. At the start of the 1917 season, Kuhn joined the Dallas Giants of the Class-B Texas League. With Dallas, he batted .252 with 85 hits, 10 doubles, two triples, and two home runs in 118 games played. Later in the 1917 season, Kuhn signed with the independent Modesto Reds.

== Later life ==
In 1918, Kuhn re-signed with the Class-B Dallas Giants of the Texas League. That year, as World War I was underway, he was drafted into the United States Army. Kuhn's rank was Sergeant. During combat training in San Antonio, Texas, Kuhn's roommate snapped a towel at Kuhn in an attempt at a practical joke. The towel hit his eye, causing him to lose his sight entirely. One other account of the incident story stated that it was a fight that caused Kuhn's roommate to snap the towel, which caused him to lose his sight. After the incident Kuhn was honorably discharged.

Kuhn returned to Dallas where he joined the Dallas Police Department in July 1919. In 1920, Kuhn was named player-manager of the Modesto Reds, a local amateur team who represented Modesto, California. In 1930, he was living with his brother, Roy Kuhn, and together worked in a fruit cannery. On June 14, 1935, at the age of 48, Kuhn died of a self-inflicted gunshot wound. An investigation by the Fresno Police Department determined that Kuhn committed suicide because of his failing health over the years. He was buried at Belmont Memorial Park in Fresno.
