= Oakland (California League) Baseball Team =

Oakland Commuters
- 1879–1915; (1879, 1881, 1885–1896, 1898–1904, 1906–1910, 1915); Oakland, California

Minor league affiliations
- Previous classes: Class D (1910, 1915); Class A (1904); Class E (1899); Class D (1898); Class B (1892)
- League: California State League (1885–1886, 1888, 1903–1904, 1906, 1910, 1915)
- Previous leagues: California League (1879, 1886–1893, 1896, 1898–1902, 1906–1909); California Players' League (1894); Central California League (1892, 1910); California Winter League (1895); New California League (1881); Pacific Coast League (1887, 1898); San Francisco City League (1896)

Team data
- Previous names: Oakland Commuters (1915); Oakland Invaders/Merced Fig Growers (1910); Oakland Commuters (1906–1910); Oakland (1904); Oakland Heeseman (1903); Oakland Reliance (1903); Oakland Clamdiggers (1902); Oakland Commuters (1901); Oakland Reliance (1898); Oakland (1892, 1894–1896); Oakland Colonels (1889–1893); Oakland Morans (1892); Oakland Clevelands (1888); Oakland Greenhood & Morans (1886–1888); Oakland Tribunes (1888); Oakland (1881, 1885, 1887); Oakland Pioneers (1879)

Several different minor league baseball teams played in the city of Oakland, California in the California League (and its alternate names) starting in 1879 until 1915. From that point, the Oakland Oaks of the Pacific Coast League took over as the main team in Oakland.
