= Hayward Cubs =

- 1910–1911; Hayward, California

Minor league affiliations
- Class: Class D (1910–1911)
- League: Central California League (1910–1911)

Major league affiliations
- Team: None

Minor league titles
- League titles (0): None

Team data
- Name: Heyward (1910); Heyward Cubs (1911)
- Ballpark: Boosters' Club Baseball Grounds (1910–1911)

The Hayward Cubs were a minor league baseball team based in Hayward, California. In 1910 and 1911, Heyward teams played as members of the Class D level Central California League. The 1910 Heyward team played a partial season after San Rafael relocated to Heyward, who then moved to Fruitvale. The 1911 Cubs resumed league play and finished in seventh place.

The Heyward teams hosted minor league home games at the Boosters' Club Baseball Grounds.

== History ==
The 1910 "Heyward" team began minor league play in the Class D level Central California League during the season. Heyward was briefly part of a 1910 league that was very unstable. Of the eight charter teams that began Central California League play in 1910, seven of the eight teams moved during the season, with three teams moving twice or more, and three teams disbanded. In all, 15 different sites were used for league play in 1910, with two cities hosting two different teams.

On June 12, 1910, the San Rafael team moved to Hayward. Hayward then relocated to replace the team in Fruitvale on July 10, after the original Fruitvale team had moved to become the Alameda Alerts. The team then disbanded while based in Fruitvale, folding on October 9, 1910.

When the Central California League ended their season on November 6, 1910, the San Rafael/Hayward/Fruitvale team had folded, but are credited with finishing in sixth place. The combined team ended the Central California League regular season with an overall record of 7–17, finishing 9.0 games behind the first place Richmond Merchants, as George Englefield, William Hull and C.W. Heyer served as managers.

Despite the Hayward team relocating during the previous season, the 1911 Hayward "Cubs" began Central California League play at the beginning of the season and finished in seventh place in a shortened season. After beginning play on April 9, 1911, the Central California League permanently folded on July 9, 1911, with the Hayward Cubs 5.0 games behind the first place San Leandro Cherry Pickers. When the league folded, the Cubs ended their 1911 season with a record of 4–9, playing the season under manager Len Schroeder.

The Central California League never reformed. Heyward has not hosted another minor league team.

== The ballpark ==
The Hayward teams hosted 1910 and 1911 home minor league games at the Boosters' Club Baseball Grounds. The ballpark was located at Myrtle Street & Filbert Street in Hayward.

== Timeline ==
| Year(s) | # Yrs. | Team | Level | League | Ballpark |
|---|---|---|---|---|---|
| 1910 | 1 | Heyward | Class D | Central California League | Boosters' Club Baseball Grounds |
| 1911 | 1 | Heyward Cubs | Class D | Central California League | Boosters' Club Baseball Grounds |

== Year–by–year records ==
| Year | Record | Finish | Manager | Notes |
|---|---|---|---|---|
| 1910 | 7–17 | 6th | George Englefield / William Hull / C.W. Heyer | San Rafael moved to Hayward June 12; Hayward moved to Fruitvale July 10; Team disbanded October 9. |
| 1911 | 4–9 | 7th | Len Schroeder | League folded July 9 |

== Notable alumni ==
- The player roster information for the Hayward teams is not known.
