= Lemoore Cubs =

- 1911; Lemoore, California

Minor league affiliations
- Class: Class D (1911)
- League: San Joaquin Valley League (1911)

Major league affiliations
- Team: None

Minor league titles
- League titles (0): None

Team data
- Name: Lemoore Cubs (1911)
- Ballpark: Unknown (1911)

The Lemoore Cubs were a minor league baseball team based in Lemoore, California. In 1911, the Lemoore Cubs played a partial season as members of the Class D level San Joaquin Valley League, which permanently folded before the conclusion of the season.

== History ==
Minor league baseball play was hosted in Lemoore, California in 1911, when the Lemoore "Cubs" team became members of the six–team Class D level San Joaquin Valley League. The Coalinga Tigers, Hanford Braves, Porterville Orange Pickers, Tulare Merchants and Visalia Colts joined Lemoore in 1911 San Joaquin Valley League play.

The Lemoore use of the "Cubs" moniker was in reference to the team signing many young players to its 1911 roster.

On March 4, 1911, it was reported that Oscar Jones had accepted the manager position of the 1911 Lemoore Cubs. Jones reported that he was looking forward to a "lively season in the valley."

On opening day in Porterville, the home team, behind pitcher Bill Thelle, defeated Lemoore and pitcher Oscar Jones by the score of 3–2, with Thelle compiling 14 strikeouts.

The 1911 San Joaquin Valley League began their second season of play on April 16, 1911, expanding from four teams to six teams. But the league permanently folded during the season. On July 18, 1911, the Lemoore Cubs were in third place when the San Joaquin Valley League folded. The league folded after the Tulare and Porterville franchises had disbanded on July 11, 1911. Lemoore ended their brief season with an overall record of 7–6. Playing under manager Oscar Jones, the Cubs finished 2.0 games behind the first place Tulare Merchants in the San Joaquin Valley League final standings. Lemoore pitcher/manager Oscar Jones led the San Joaquin Valley League with 7 wins.

The final 1911 San Joaquin Valley League standings were led by the Tulare Merchants (9–4), followed by the Coalinga Tigers (8–6), Lemoore Cubs (7–6), Hanford Braves (6–7), Visalia Colts (5–8) and Porterville Orange Pickers (5–8). Lemoore, California has not hosted another minor league team.

== The ballpark ==
The name of the 1911 Lemoore Cubs' home ballpark is unknown.

Kings County and Lemoore, California locations.

== Year-by-year record ==
Year	Record	Finish	Manager	Playoffs
1911	7–6	3rd	Oscar Jones	League folded July 18

== Notable alumni ==
- Oscar Jones (1911, MGR)
- Lemoore Cubs players
