= Hanford Braves =

- 1911; Hanford, California

Minor league affiliations
- Class: Class D (1911)
- League: San Joaquin Valley League (1911)

Major league affiliations
- Team: None

Minor league titles
- League titles (0): None
- Wild card berths (0): None

Team data
- Name: Hanford Braves (1911)
- Ballpark: Hanford Ball Park (1911)

The Hanford Braves were a minor league baseball team based in Hanford, California, United States. In 1911, the Hanford Braves played a partial season as members of the Class D level San Joaquin Valley League, which permanently folded during the 1911 season. The Braves hosted home minor league games at the Hanford Ball Park.

== History ==
Minor league baseball play was first hosted in Hanford, California in 1911, when the Hanford "Braves" team became members of the six–team Class D level San Joaquin Valley League during the season. The Coalinga Tigers, Lemoore Cubs, Porterville Orange Pickers, Tulare Merchants and Visalia Colts joined Hanford in 1911 San Joaquin Valley League play.

The 1911 San Joaquin Valley League began their second season of play on April 16, 1911, expanding from four teams to six teams, with the Hanford Braves being a new league franchise. The San Joaquin Valley League permanently folded during the 1911 season. On July 18, 1911, the Hanford Braves were in fourth place when the San Joaquin Valley League folded. The league folded after the Tulare and Porterville franchises had disbanded on July 11, 1911. Hanford ended the season with an overall record of 6–7. Playing under manager Sidney Jehl, the Braves finished 3.0 games behind the first place Tulare Merchants in the San Joaquin Valley League final standings.

The overall 1911 San Joaquin Valley League standings were led by the Tulare Merchants (9–4), followed by the Coalinga Tigers (8–6), Lemoore Cubs (7–6), Hanford Braves (6–7), Visalia Colts (5–8) and Porterville Orange Pickers (5–8).

After the San Joaquin Valley League folded, a Hanford team reportedly continued play in 1911 as a semi–professional team. The reformed Hanford team was noted to be under the direction of Frank Blakeley with Oscar Jones on the roster. Jones had played with the Lemoore Cubs during San Joaquin Valley League play.

Hanford, California has not hosted another minor league team.

== The ballpark ==
The 1911 Hanford Braves were noted to have hosted home minor league games at the Hanford Ball Park. The ballpark was reportedly located at North Kensington Way & East Grangeville Boulevard. The location today is directly adjacent to the ballparks for Hanford High School teams. Hanford High School is located at 120 East Grangeville Boulevard in Hanford, California.

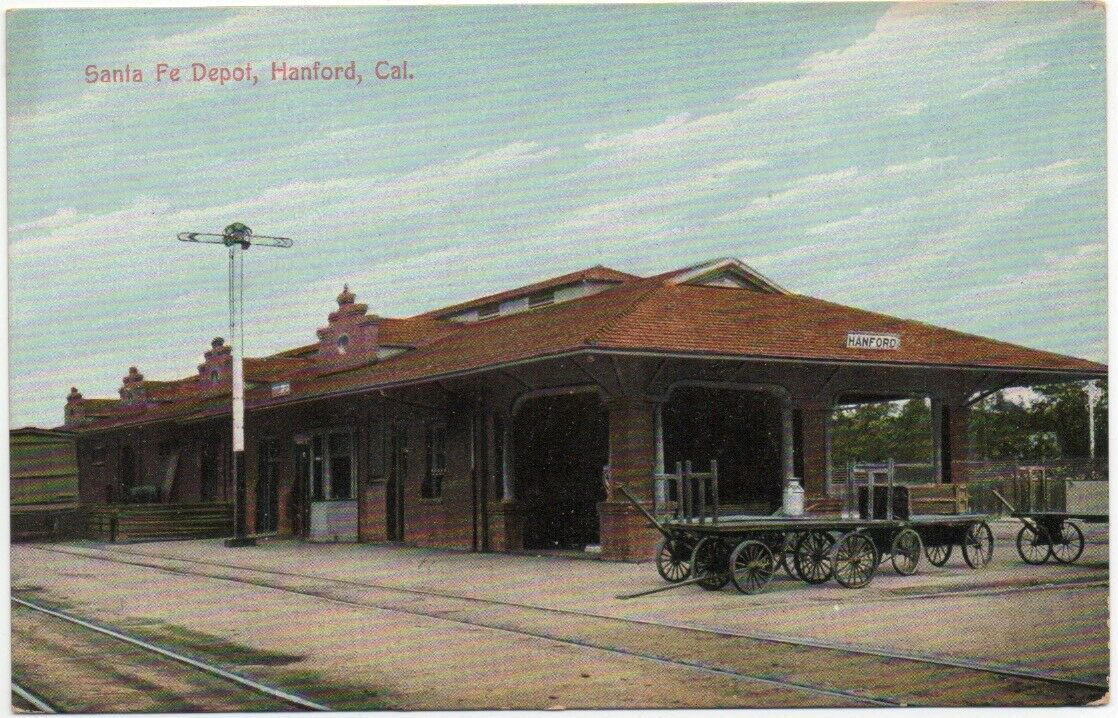
(1910) Hanford Santa Fe Depot. Hanford, California.

== Year-by-year record ==
Year	Record	Finish	Manager	Playoffs
1911	6–7	4th	Sidney Jehl	League folded July 18

== Notable alumni ==
- Oscar Jones (1911)

The complete 1911 Hanford Braves' roster is unknown.
