= Petaluma Baseball Team =

- 1894–1911; (1894, 1903, 1910–1911); Petaluma, California

Minor league affiliations
- Previous classes: Class D
- Previous leagues: Central California League (1910–1911); California State League (1903); California Players' League (1894)

Team data
- Previous names: Oakland Carroll Emery Arms (1911); Elmhurst Tildens (1910–1911); Elmhurst Incubators (1910); Petaluma Incubators (1910); Petaluma (1903); Petaluma Poison Oaks (1894)

The city of Petaluma, California was the home to minor league baseball teams in the late 19th and early 20th centuries. The first team, known as the Petaluma Poison Oaks played in the California Players' League in 1894. A second team played in the California State League in 1903. The third and final team was the Petaluma Incubators who played in the Central California League in 1910. This team moved to Elmhurst, California during the 1910 season and was renamed as the Elmhurst Incubators and then in 1911 became the Elmhurst Tildens. The team moved again, during the 1911 season to Oakland Carroll, California as the Oakland Carroll Emery Arms. They shut down at that point and no further teams have played in any of these cities.
