= Tulare Merchants =

- 1910–1911; Tulare, California

Minor league affiliations
- Class: Class D (1910–1911)
- League: San Joaquin Valley League (1910–1911)

Major league affiliations
- Team: None

Minor league titles
- League titles (1): 1911

Team data
- Name: Tulare Merchants (1910–1911)
- Ballpark: Unknown (1910–1911)

The Tulare Merchants were a minor league baseball team based in Tulare, California. In 1910 and 1911, the Merchants played exclusively as members of the Class D level San Joaquin Valley League, winning the 1911 league championship in their final season of play.

== History ==
Minor league baseball play was first hosted in Tulare, California in 1910, when the Tulare "Merchants" team became charter members of the four–team Class D level San Joaquin Valley League. The Bakersfield Drillers, Coalinga Savages and Visalia Pirates teams joined Tulare as the 1910 San Joaquin Valley League charter franchises.

In their first season of play, the 1910 Tulare Merchants franchise folded before the end of the San Joaquin Valley League season. On August 8, 1910, the team folded with a 13–15 record. The 1910 Tulare managers were Gene Nast and Willis Kelley. Later, the Coalinga franchise disbanded on August 18, 1910. The San Joaquin Valley League folded on September 12, 1910, with the Bakersfield Drillers (21–10) and Visalia Pirates (13–17) as the remaining teams. Red Kuhn of Tulare won the San Joaquin Valley League batting title, hitting .375, while Kuhn and teammate Slim Bath led the league with 2 home runs.

In 1911, the Tulare Merchants continued San Joaquin Valley League play, as the league expanded to become a six–team league. The Coalinga Tigers, Hanford Braves, Lemoore Cubs, Porterville Orange Pickers and Visalia Colts joined Tulare in the second season of San Joaquin Valley League play.

After the 1911 San Joaquin Valley League began their second season of play on April 16, 1911, the league permanently folded with the Tulare Merchants as league champions. On July 18, 1911, the Tulare Merchants were in first place when the San Joaquin Valley League folded. The league folded after the Tulare Merchants and Porterville Orange Pickers franchises had both disbanded on July 11, 1911. Tulare ended the season with an overall record of 9–4. Playing under managers Otto Dye and Johnny Eagle, the Merchants finished 1½ games ahead of the second place Coalinga Tigers in the San Joaquin Valley League final standings.

The overall 1911 San Joaquin Valley League standings were led by the Tulare Merchants (9–4), followed by the Coalinga Tigers (8–6), Lemoore Cubs (7–6), Hanford Braves (6–7), Visalia Colts (5–8) and Porterville Orange Pickers (4–8).

The Tulare Merchants continued play in subsequent years as a team in semi–professional leagues.

Tulare, California has not hosted another minor league team.

== The ballpark ==
The name of the Tulare Merchants' home minor league ballpark is unknown.

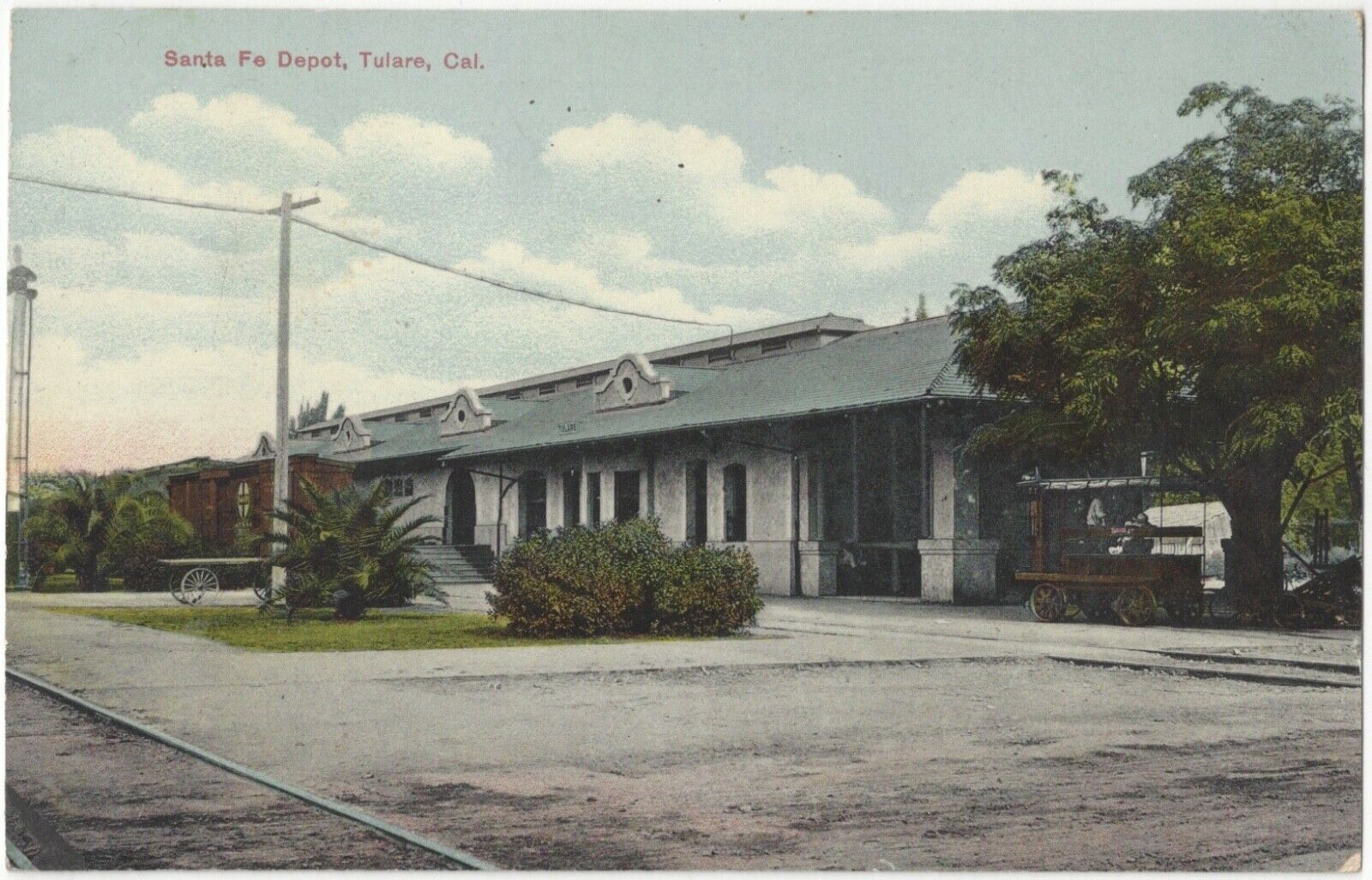
(1910) Tulare Santa Fe Depot. Tulare, California.

== Year–by–year records ==
Year	Record	Finish	Manager	Playoffs
1910	13–15	3rd	Gene Nast / Willis Kelley	Team folded August 8
1911	9–4	1st	Otto Dye / Johnny Eagle	League champions League folded July 18

== Notable alumni ==
- Jess Buckles (1910)

The 1910 and 1911 Tulare Merchants' complete rosters are unknown.

Hugh Garrity played for the 1911 Tulare Merchants.
