= San Bernardino Padres =

- 1929; San Bernardino, California

Minor league affiliations
- Class: Class D (1929)
- League: California State League (1929)

Major league affiliations
- Team: None

Minor league titles
- League titles (0): None

Team data
- Name: San Bernardino Padres (1929)
- Ballpark: Unknown (1929)

The San Bernardino Padres were a minor league baseball team based in San Bernardino, California. In 1929, the Padres played as members of the four-team Class D level California State League, finishing in third place in a shortened season.

== History ==
Minor league baseball was first hosted in San Bernardino, California in 1899, when the San Bernardino Grays team played the season as members of the independent level Southern California League. The Grays finished in first place in the four-team league with a 19–9 record.

Minor league baseball returned to San Bernardino in 1929, when the San Bernardino "Padres" became members of the four–team Class D level California State League. The Bakersfield Bees, San Diego Aces and Santa Ana Orange Countians joined San Bernardino in beginning league play on April 10, 1929.

On June 5, 1929, San Bernardino was scheduled to play a series on the road at Bakersfield before a last-minute schedule change. At the time, the team was in first place. The Padres instead hosted a home series against the Coronado Arabs team. The Padres had won five of seven games heading into the series.

Later, San Bernardino was swept in a series in San Diego against the Aces and fell out of first place.

On June 17, 1929, the California State League permanently folded during the season. At the time the league folded, Bakersfield was in third place with a 32–29 overall record. Managed by Rube Ellis, the Padres ended the season 3.0 games behind the first place San Diego Aces in the final league standings. Padres pitcher George Caster led the league with both 12 wins and 80 strikeouts in the shortened season. The California State league never reformed.

After an 11 season gap, San Bernardino next hosted minor league baseball when the 1941 San Bernardino Stars played a partial season as members of the eight-team Class C level California League as a minor league affiliate of the New York Giants. The Stars folded on June 29, 1941, along with the Riverside Reds team. San Bernardino had a 43–28 record when the franchise folded.

Today, San Bernardino hosts the Inland Empire 66ers of the Class A level California State League after the franchise first joined the league in 1987.

== The ballpark ==
The name of the home minor league ballpark for the 1929 San Bernardino Padres is unknown. Perris Hill Park was in use in the 1920s as a newly formed public park. Perris Hill Park became the site of Fiscalini Field, which was constructed in 1934 and first served as a minor league park for the 1941 San Bernardino Stars.

== Year-by-year record ==
| Year | Record | Finish | Manager | Notes |
|---|---|---|---|---|
| 1929 | 32–29 | 3rd | Rube Ellis | League folded June 17 |

== Notable alumni ==
- George Caster (1929)
- Joe Coscarart (1929)
- Rube Ellis (1929, MGR)
- Mike Hunt (1929)

== See also ==
- San Bernardino Padres players
