= San Joaquin Valley League =

- Classification: Class D (1910); Independent (1911)
- Sport: Minor League Baseball
- First season: 1910
- Folded: July 18, 1911
- President: Newton Young (1910–1911)
- No. of teams: 7
- Country: United States of America
- Most titles: 1 Bakersfield Drillers (1910); Tulare Merchants (1911)
- Related competitions: Southern California League

The San Joaquin Valley League was a minor league baseball league that operated from 1910 through 1911. The league operated primarily in the San Joaquin Valley in California. The league disbanded on July 18, 1911. The Bakersfield Drillers and Tulare Merchants won league championships.

== Cities represented ==
- Bakersfield, CA: Bakersfield Drillers 1910
- Coalinga, CA: Coalinga Savages 1910; Coalinga Tigers 1911
- Hanford, CA: Hanford Braves 1911
- Lemoore, CA: Lemoore Cubs 1911
- Porterville, CA: Porterville Orange Pickers 1911
- Tulare, CA: Tulare Merchants 1910–1911
- Visalia, CA: Visalia Pirates 1910; Visalia Colts 1911

== Standings & statistics ==
=== 1910 San Joaquin Valley League ===
Team standings	W	L	PCT	GB	Managers
Bakersfield Drillers	21	10	.667	-	Brick Devereaux
Visalia Pirates	13	17	.433	7.5	Lou Maire
Tulare Merchants	13	15	.464	NA	Gene Nast / Willis Kelley
Coalinga Savages	9	14	.391	NA	Zed Phelps / Ed Householder

Tulare disbanded August 8; Coalinga disbanded August 18.
The league officially disbanded September 12.

Player statistics
Player	Team	Stat	Tot	Player	Team	Stat	Tot
Red Kuhn	Tulare	BA	.375	Willard Meikle	Bakersfield	W	11
Ned Smith	Visalia	Runs	18	Willard Meikle	Bakersfield	SO	101
Brick Devereaux	Bakersfield	Hits	34	Willard Meikle	Bakersfield	PCT	.733; 11–4
Red Kuhn	Tulare	HR	2				
Roy Kuhn	Coalinga	HR	2				
Slim Bath	Tulare	HR	2				

=== 1911 San Joaquin Valley League ===
Team standings	W	L	PCT	GB	Managers
Tulare Merchants	9	4	.692	-	Otto Dye / Johnny Eagle
Coalinga Tigers	8	6	.571	1.5	Clyde Williams
Lemoore Cubs	7	6	.538	2.0	Oscar Jones
Hanford Braves	6	7	.462	3.0	Sidney Jehl
Visalia Colts	5	8	.385	4.0	Artie Smith / Lou Maire
Porterville Orange Pickers	4	8	.333	4.5	Harry Simpson

Tulare and Porterville disbanded July 11.
The league officially disbanded July 18.

Player statistics
Player	Team	Stat	Tot	Player	Team	Stat	Tot
Tom Fitzsimmons	Porterfield	BA	.457	Oscar Jones	Lemoore	W	7
Billy Hamilton	Hanford	Runs	12	Curley Ray	Coalinga	W	7
Sidney Jehl	Stockton	Hits	21	Curley Ray	Coalinga	SO	98
George Porterfiel	Coalinga	HR	2	Lefty Tripplett	Hanford	PCT	.800 4–1
