= Bakersfield Drillers =

- 1910; (1910, 1929); Bakersfield, California

Minor league affiliations
- Class: Class D (1910, 1929)
- League: San Joaquin Valley League (1910); California State League (1929)

Major league affiliations
- Team: None

Minor league titles
- League titles (1): 1910

Team data
- Name: Bakersfield Drillers (1910); Bakersfield Bees (1929)
- Ballpark: Recreation Park (1910)

The Bakersfield Drillers were a minor league baseball team based in Bakersfield, California. In 1910, the Drillers played as members of the Class D level San Joaquin Valley League, winning the league championship in a shortened season in the only season for the league. Bakersfield returned to minor league play in 1929 when the Bakersfield "Bees" played in the final shortened season of the California State League. Bakersfield hosted home games at Recreation Park.

== History ==
Minor league baseball was first hosted in Bakersfield, California in 1910, when the Bakersfield Drillers became founding members of the four–team Class D level San Joaquin Valley League. The Coalinga Savages, Tulare Merchants and Visalia Pirates joined Bakersfield as charter members to begin the season.

On September 12, 1910, Bakersfield had a record of 21–9 under manager Brick Devereaux when the San Joaquin Valley League folded. Bakersfield was 7.5 games ahead of second place Visalia (13–17) in the standings at the time the league folded. Previously, the Tulare (13–15) franchise had folded on August 8, 1910 and Coalinga (9–14) folded on August 18, 1910. Pitcher Willard Meikle of Bakersfield led the league with 11 wins, 101 strikeouts and an 11–4 record.

The Bakersfield use of the "Drillers" moniker corresponds with oil drilling in the area. The Kern River Oil Field began oil production in 1899 and is still in operation today.

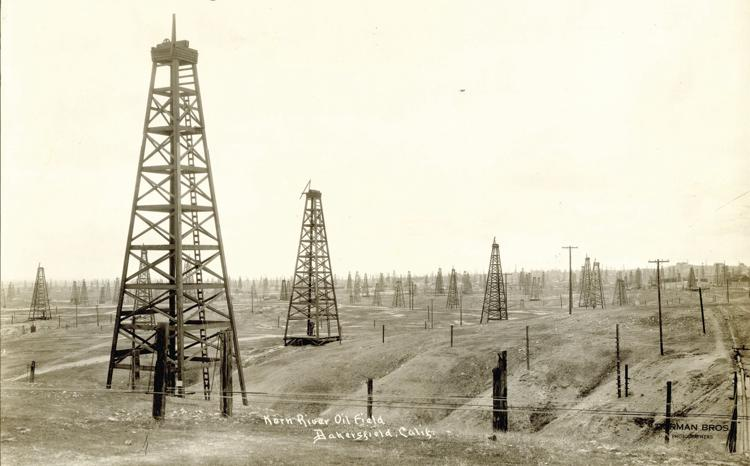
(1910) Kern River Oil Field. Bakersfield, California.

Minor league baseball returned briefly to Bakersfield in 1929. The Bakersfield Bees began the season as members of the four–team Class D level California State League. The San Diego Aces, San Bernardino Padres and Santa Ana Orange Countians joined Bakersfield in league play. Josh Clark was president of the Bakersfield team.

On opening day, April 10, 1929, Santa Ana defeated Bakersfield 7-6 at Recreation Park in Bakersfield.

During the season, on June 17, 1929, the California State League permanently folded. At the time the league folded, Bakersfield was in 2nd place with a 32–28 overall record. Managed by Louis Guisto and Ned Porter, the Bakersfield Bees finished 2½ games behind the first place San Diego Aces in the final standings. Lou Martin of Bakersfield led the league in hitting, batting .389 and player/manager Ned Porter led the California State League with 15 home runs. The California State League did not reform for a 1930 season.

Bakersfield next hosted minor league baseball when the 1941 Bakersfield Badgers began play as members of the Class C level California League.

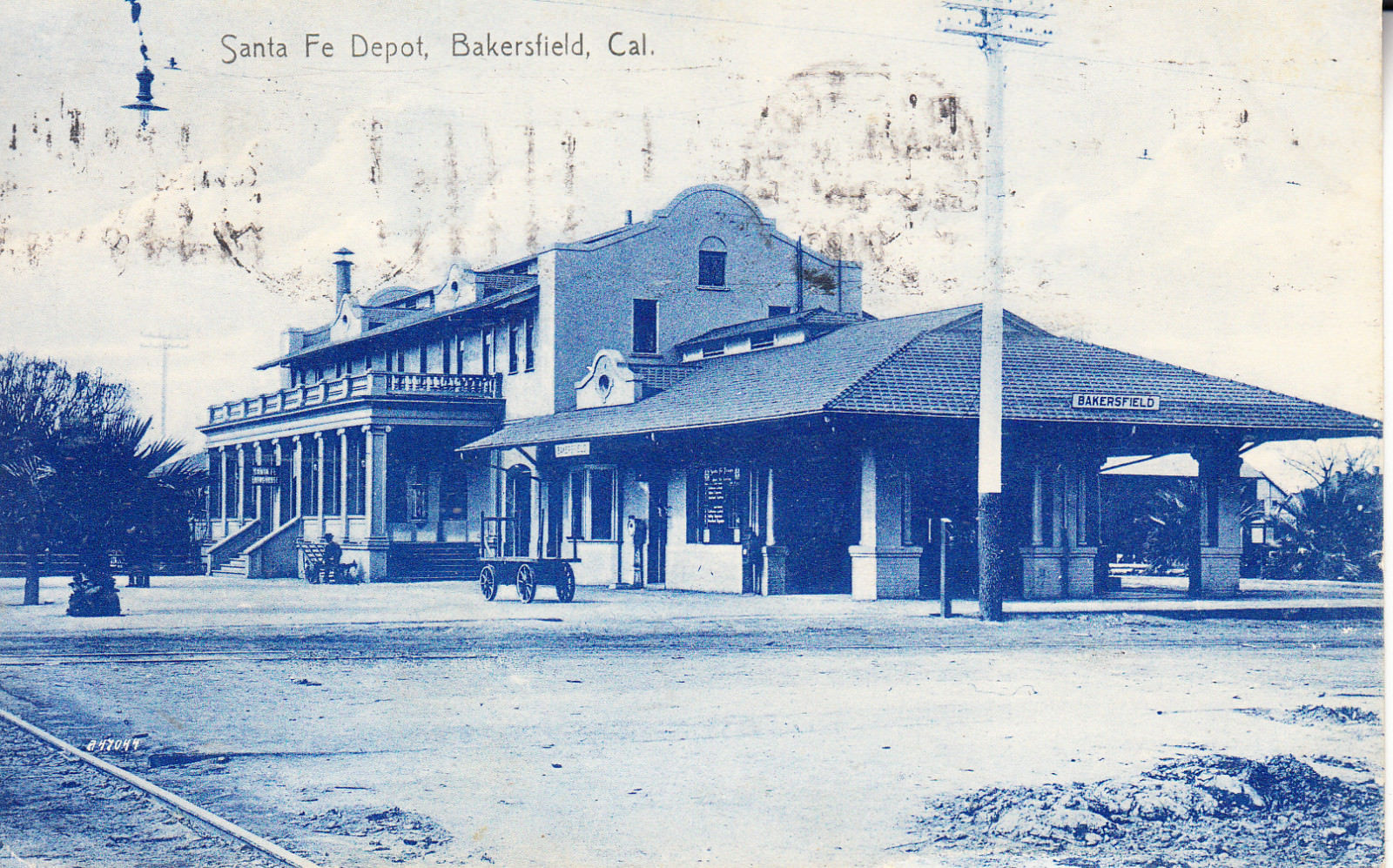
(1909) Santa Fe Depot. Bakersfield, California.

== The ballpark ==
Bakersfield hosted minor league home games at Recreation Park.

== Timeline ==
Year(s)	# Yrs.	Team	Level	League	Ballpark
1910	1	Bakersfield Drillers	Class D	Southern California League	Recreation Park
1929	1	Bakersfield Bees	Class D	California State League	Recreation Park

== Year-by-year records ==
Year	Record	Finish	Manager	Notes
1910	21–9	1st	Brick Devereaux	League folded September 12; League champions
1929	32–28	2nd	Louis Guisto / Ned Porter	League folded June 17

== Notable alumni ==
- Roy Joiner (1929)
- Monte Pearson (1929)
- Bill Phebus (1929)
- Frenchy Uhalt (1929)

== See also ==
Bakersfield Bees players
