= Chet Brewer =

American baseball player (1907–1990)

- Pitcher
- Born: January 14, 1907; Leavenworth, Kansas, U.S.
- Died: March 26, 1990 (aged 83); Whittier, California, U.S.
- Batted: Both Threw: Right

Major league statistics
- Win–loss record: 60–53
- Earned run average: 3.48
- Strikeouts: 492
- Stats at Baseball Reference

Teams
- Gilkerson's Union Giants (1924); Kansas City Monarchs (1925–1935); Washington Pilots (1932); New York Cubans (1936); Santo Domingo Stars (1937); Pittsburgh Crawfords (1937); Alijadores de Tampico (1938–1939); Kansas City Monarchs (1941); Philadelphia Stars (1941); Diablos Rojos del Mexico (1944); Chicago American Giants (1946); Cleveland Buckeyes (1946–1948); Visalia Cubs (1952); Porterville Comets (1952); Carman Cardinals (1953)

Career highlights and awards
- Negro National League ERA leader (1929)

Chester Arthur Brewer (January 14, 1907 – March 26, 1990) was an American professional baseball pitcher in Negro league baseball.

== Early life ==
Brewer was born in Leavenworth, Kansas. As a child, his family relocated to Des Moines, Iowa, fleeing more pervasive racism in Kansas. In Iowa, schools were integrated. He graduated from West Des Moines High School, now known as Valley High School. He was inspired to become a pitcher by Bullet Rogan, a future teammate.

== Professional career ==
Brewer played 19 non-consecutive seasons of professional baseball at various levels between 1925 and 1953, most notably for the Kansas City Monarchs. From 1957 to 1974 he scouted for the Pittsburgh Pirates.

Brewer toiled on the mounds of black baseball for twenty-four years with an assortment of teams throughout the world, including China, Japan, the Philippines, Hawaii, Canada, Mexico, Panama, Puerto Rico, Haiti, Santo Domingo, and in forty-four of the forty-eight continental United States.

While with the Kansas City Monarchs, Brewer was a part of legendary starting rotations including Rogan and Satchel Paige. The Monarchs won their first Negro World Series in 1924, a year that Brewer had been on the team, albeit not during the series.

Brewer had a lively fastball and a devastating overhand "drop ball," which was especially tough on left-handed hitters. He also threw an emery ball (learned from Emory Osborne and Ted "Double Duty" Radcliffe.) when such practice was legal.

Brewer's career covered a wide experiential range, including playing against major leaguers in exhibition games. In 1934 he pitched against an all-star team that included Jimmie Foxx and Heinie Manush, and later was manager of the Kansas City Royals, who played in the California Winter League against Bob Feller and other major leaguers. In 1945, he managed the Kansas City Royals of the California Winter League, coaching among other players a young Jackie Robinson, already destined for the Brooklyn Dodgers' organization.

In 1952 Brewer was a player-manager for the Porterville Comets of the Southwest International League, becoming one of the first black managers in Minor League Baseball history, as he joined Sam Bankhead, who a year earlier played and managed for the Farnham Pirates of the Provincial League. At 45, Brewer posted a 6–5 record in 24 pitching appearances (seven starts), posting a 3.38 ERA for the fourth-best in the league. Brewer and his staff also coached Los Angeles Inner City athletes on weekends, players such as: George Hendrick, Ellis Valentine, Reggie Smith, infielder turned CBS Sports Broadcaster Rich Perez and Don Newcombe’s son participated as well.

Chet Brewer died at age 83 in Whittier, California. He was buried at Inglewood Park Cemetery.
