= Henry Schmidt =

Henry Schmidt may refer to:

- Henry Schmidt (American football) (1935–2021), American football defensive tackle
- Henry Schmidt (baseball) (1873–1926), baseball pitcher
- Henry C. Schmidt (born 1937), associate professor of history at Texas A&M University
