= Oscar Stanage =

American baseball player (1883–1964)

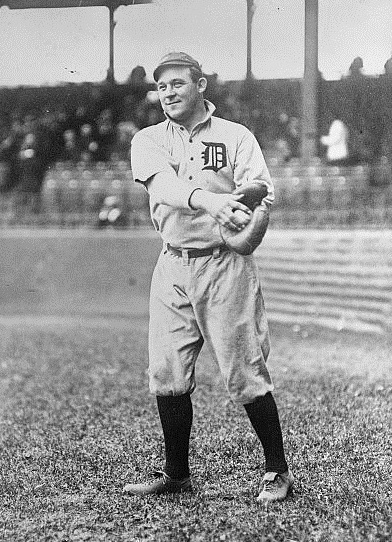
- Stanage in 1913
- Catcher
- Born: March 17, 1883; Tulare, California, U.S.
- Died: November 11, 1964 (aged 81); Detroit, Michigan, U.S.
- Batted: Right Threw: Right

MLB debut
- May 19, 1906, for the Cincinnati Reds

Last MLB appearance
- June 17, 1925, for the Detroit Tigers

MLB statistics
- Batting average: .234
- Hits: 819
- Runs batted in: 321
- Stats at Baseball Reference

Teams
- Cincinnati Reds (1906); Detroit Tigers (1909–1920, 1925)

Career highlights and awards
- American League record for assists by a catcher (212 in 1911); 1909 World Series

Oscar Harland Stanage (March 17, 1883 – November 11, 1964) was an American baseball catcher. He played professional baseball for 24 years from 1903 to 1926, including 13 seasons in Major League Baseball with the Detroit Tigers.

A native of Tulare, California, he began his baseball career with the Stockton Millers. He was signed by the St. Louis Cardinals in 1906 and promptly traded to the Reds for whom he had only one plate appearance before returning to the minor leagues. In August 1908, Stanage was purchased by the Tigers and remained with them from 1909 to 1920. He appeared in 1,096 major league games, 1,074 as a catcher, and compiled a .236 batting average and .284 on-base percentage. In 1911, he set an American League record with 212 assists as a catcher, a record that still stands. He led the American League in assists by a catcher three times (1911, 1912, and 1914) and threw out 830 base runners in the 1910s, more than any other American League catcher. He ranks among the all-time career leaders at catcher with 1,381 assists (14th), 931 runners caught stealing (14th), and 1,297 stolen bases allowed (10th).

In the 1920s, Stanage was also implicated in an alleged game-fixing scandal arising out of a 1917 series with the Chicago White Sox; Stanage claimed the money he received was a reward for beating the Boston Red Sox rather than losing to the White Sox. Stanage finished his career in the minor leagues for the Los Angeles Angels (1921), Sacramento Senators (1922), Visalia Pirates (1923), and Toronto Maple Leafs (1924). He served as a player-coach for the Tigers in 1925, player-manager of the Evansville Hubs in 1926, and a coach for the Pittsburgh Pirates from 1927 to 1931.

== Early years ==
Stanage was born in Tulare, California, in 1883, the son of a rancher and farmer. Stanage attended Stockton High School and was a catcher on the school's baseball team and a star of the football team. He played independent baseball after graduating from high school.

== Professional baseball ==
=== Minor leagues and Cincinnati ===
Stanage began playing professional baseball for the Stockton Millers in the California State League from 1903 to 1906. In 1906, he was signed by the St. Louis Cardinals and then traded in May of that year to the Cincinnati Reds. On May 19, 1906, he appeared in his only game with the Reds, had only one plate appearance and did not get on base.

In late July 1906, the Reds assigned Stanage to the Memphis Chicks in the Southern Association. Stanage spent the 1907 and 1908 seasons with the Newark Bears in the Eastern League, compiling batting averages of .201 and .197.

=== Detroit Tigers ===
On August 6, 1908, the Tigers purchased Stanage from Newark subject to the caveat that he would remain with Newark until the end of the season. In the spring of 1909, Stanage immediately impressed observers with his strong arm. He shared the catcher position with Boss Schmidt; Schmidt appeared in 81 games as catcher and Stanage in 77. Stanage compiled a .262 batting average in 252 at bats with six triples and 21 RBIs. The Tigers won the American League pennant, and in the 1909 World Series, Stanage appeared in two games and had a single, a sacrifice hit, two RBIs, and two strikeouts in five at bats.

Stanage and Schmidt continued to share catching duty for the Tigers in 1910 with Stanage appearing in 84 and Schmidt 66 games behind the plate. However, Stanage's batting average dropped 55 points from .262 in 1909 to .207 in 1910.

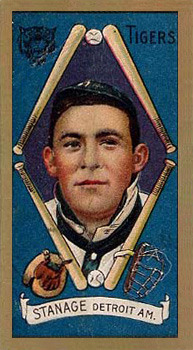
Stanage in 1911

In 1911, Stanage became the Tigers' regular catcher and compiled a career high .264 batting average with 27 extra base hits and 51 RBIs. He also led the American League's catchers with 141 defensive games at catcher, 599 putouts, 212 assists, 41 errors, 178 stolen bases allowed, and 156 base runners caught stealing. His 212 assists in 1911 set an American League record that remains more than 100 years later. However, his 41 errors was an American League record and the most by a major league catcher in the 20th century. Interviewed in 1962, Stanage took pride in his 1911 assists record, saying, "That tells the story. If my infielders hadn't dropped so many of my throws, I'd have had a lot more assists and a lot less errors."

Stanage also led the American League in assists by a catcher in 1912 (168) and 1914 (190). Stanage had over 100 assists at the catcher position for seven straight years from 1910 to 1916. He collected 1,045 assists in 738 games over that seven-year stretch, an average of 1.42 assists per game. His career average of 1.29 assists per game is the fifth best in major league history, behind Duke Farrell, Red Dooin, Johnny Kling, and Bill Killefer. Known to have a strong arm, Stanage also threw out 830 base runners in the 1910s, more than any other American League catcher. Stanage also led the league with 14 double plays and 17 passed balls in 1912 and 30 errors in 1914.

Known as a student of the game, Stanage was the only catcher who prevented Connie Mack's Philadelphia Athletics from stealing signs. Mack's Athletics had become notorious for stealing the opposing team's signs in 1911. Sports writer Norman E. Brown wrote that Stanage's greatest strength was his ability to handle pitchers: "Stanage's steadiness and ability in handling uncertain pitchers was probably his greatest asset. He is 'wise' in the ways of pitching, sizes up a hurler's weakness quickly and is a great aid in ironing out of the rough spots of a young hurler's delivery."

In January 1917, Stanage was expelled from the Baseball Players Fraternity, an early players union, for signing a contract with the Tigers for the 1917 prior to receiving authorization from the union. Stanage said at the time that he was pleased with the salary offered by the Tigers and that he quit the union "because I couldn't see what good it was doing me."

Stanage was a weak hitter, batting for a .234 average in 14 years. He ranks second all time behind Billy Sullivan for having the lowest slugging percentage by a catcher in a major league season with a .233 slugging percentage in 1914. Because of his weak hitting, the Tigers were always looking for a better-hitting catcher, trying Jack Onslow, Red McKee, Del Baker, Tubby Spencer and Archie Yelle. Eddie Ainsmith finally won the job in 1919, but Stanage regained the starting role in 1920. Over the course of his career, Stanage appeared in 1,075 games as a catcher for the Tigers – second in club history to Bill Freehan's 1,581 games and ahead of Lance Parrish's 1,039 games at the position.

=== Game-fixing allegations ===
In 1922, allegations arose concerning a three-game series against Chicago White Sox on September 2 and 3, 1917. The White Sox were in a pennant race with the Boston Red Sox and swept the series. Two weeks later, the Tigers swept a three-game series against the Red Sox, The White Sox collected a fund which was paid to Tigers players. Stanage said that White Sox players, Swede Risberg and Chick Gandil, had paid $200 each to three Detroit pitchers and $75 to Stanage. Stanage insisted, "It was merely a reward for our beating the Red Sox and there was nothing about laying down mentioned." Gandil and Risberg later stated that they had, in fact, paid the Tigers $45 apiece for "sloughing" in the series against the White Sox. Stanage testified at the hearing called by Commissioner Kenesaw Mountain Landis and was asked if he thought there was anything about him giving up 21 stolen bases in the series with the White Sox. Stanage drew laughs when he answered, "That happened to me lots of times."

=== Minor leagues ===
In January 1921, the Tigers traded Stanage and three other players to the Los Angeles Angels of the Pacific Coast League (PCL) in exchange for catcher Johnny Bassler. Stanage appeared in 96 games as a catcher for the Angels and compiled a .278 batting average.

In December 1921, the Angels sold Stanage to the Sacramento Senators, also of the PCL. Stanage appeared in 96 games as a catcher for Sacramento in 1922 and compiled a .267 batting average.

In March 1923, Stanage signed to play for the Visalia Pirates. He was released by Visalia in early June as part of a cost-cutting measure by the San Joaquin Valley teams.

On February 1, 1924, Stanage signed with the Toronto Maple Leafs of the International League. He appeared in 96 games for Toronto, 92 of them as a catcher, and compiled a .252 batting average.

=== Coaching career ===
In February 1925, Stanage was hired by Detroit manager Ty Cobb as the Tigers' pitching coach. Stanage also appeared in three games as a player in 1925, garnering one hit in five at bats. He played his last major league game on June 17, 1925.

In January 1926, Stanage was hired as a player-manager for the Evansville Hubs of the Three-Eye League. At age 43, he appeared in 86 games for Evansville, 79 as a catcher, and compiled a .251 batting average.

On November 30, 1926, after Cobb left as the Tigers' manager, Stanage was hired as a coach for the Pittsburgh Pirates; his former Detroit teammate Donie Bush had just been hired as the Pirates' manager. After five years as a coach for the Pirates, Stanage was released on September 1, 1931.

== Family and later years ==
After his playing career was over, Stanage lived in Detroit. He worked for 21 years in the Wayne County Treasurer's Office until 1949 when he was forced to retire at age 66. In the 1950s, he worked as a watchman for Detroit Tigers games at Briggs Stadium.

Stanage was married three times. His first wife was Lucille, to whom he was married in 1915. Lucille was arrested in 1921 for passing a bad check in Oakland, California; she was released after Stanage made good on the check. In June 1922, Lucile filed for divorce, charging that Stanage "kept company with other women and frequently abused her." She was arrested two months later on charges of again passing a bad check.

Stanage's second wife was Della with whom he had two sons and two daughters; Della died in 1950. After the death of Della, Stanage was remarried to his third wife, Mabel.

Stanage died at Detroit Osteopathic Hospital in 1964 after a long illness at age 81.
