= Santa Cruz Sand Crabs =

- 1888–1909; (1888, 1898–1899, 1908–1909); Santa Cruz, California

Minor league affiliations
- Previous classes: Independent (1908–1909); Class-E (1899)
- Previous leagues: California League (1899, 1908–1909); Pacific Coast League (1898); California State League (1888)

Team data
- Previous names: Santa Cruz Sand Crabs (1899, 1908–1909); Santa Cruz Beachcombers (1899); Santa Cruz (1888, 1898)

The Santa Cruz Sand Crabs (also called the Beachcombers) were a minor league baseball team located in Santa Cruz, California. They competed primarily in the California League between 1888 and 1909.
