= George Caster =

American baseball player (1907–1955)

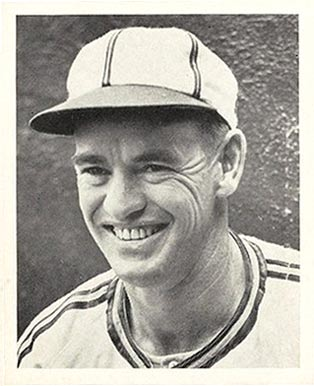
- Pitcher
- Born: August 4, 1907; Colton, California, U.S.
- Died: December 18, 1955 (aged 48); Lakewood, California, U.S.
- Batted: Right Threw: Right

MLB debut
- September 10, 1934, for the Philadelphia Athletics

Last MLB appearance
- September 16, 1946, for the Detroit Tigers

MLB statistics
- Win–loss record: 76–100
- Earned run average: 4.54
- Strikeouts: 595
- Stats at Baseball Reference

Teams
- Philadelphia Athletics (1934–1935, 1937–1940); St. Louis Browns (1941–1945); Detroit Tigers (1945–1946)

Career highlights and awards
- World Series champion (1945)

George Jasper Caster (August 4, 1907 – December 18, 1955), nicknamed "Ug", was an American professional baseball right-handed pitcher for 21 years from 1929 to 1948 and again in 1953. He played 12 years in Major League Baseball with the Philadelphia Athletics (1934–1935, 1937–1940), St. Louis Browns (1941–1945), and Detroit Tigers (1945–1946).

Caster became known as an early knuckleball pitcher. He played for American League pennant winning teams in both 1944 and 1945. He appeared in 376 major league games and compiled a career record of 76–100 in 1377 2/3 innings pitched.

== Early years ==
Caster was born in Colton, California, in 1907. He played baseball and football at Colton High School. Caster played shortstop until his senior year, when injuries to Colton's pitchers led to his taking up pitching. He also played two years of baseball at San Bernardino Junior College and was an athlete at the University of Southern California for part of a year before beginning his career as a professional baseball player. Caster was also a pitcher for the Colton Cement Dusters in 1928.

== Professional baseball career ==
=== Pacific Coast League ===
Caster signed with the San Francisco Seals of the Pacific Coast League in 1929. He was farmed out to the San Bernardino Padres in the California State League for the 1929 season. After compiling a 12–5 record in 20 games with San Bernardino, Caster was promoted to the Pacific Coast League, playing for the Mission Reds from 1929 to 1932. In 1931, he compiled a 13–17 record and 5.07 earned run average (ERA) in 35 games for the Reds. He also played for the Seattle Indians in 1933, compiling a 12–19 record and 5.80 ERA in 47 games. He divided the 1934 season between Seattle and the Portland Beavers of the Pacific Coast League, compiling a 1–15 record and 3.40 ERA in 34 games.

=== Philadelphia Athletics ===
In September 1934, Caster made his major league debut with the Philadelphia Athletics. He compiled a 3–2 record for the A's in 1934 and returned to the team in 1935. He appeared in 25 games for the 1935 A's, all but one as a relief pitcher. He finished the season with a 1–4 record and 6.25 ERA.

Caster was optioned by the Athletics to the Portland Beavers for the 1936 season, which proved to be the best of Caster's career. In 44 games for Portland, he compiled a 25–13 record and a 2.79 ERA – a career high in wins and a career low in ERA. He was the leader in the Pacific Coast League in 1936 in both wins and strikeouts (234). In a front page profile, The Sporting News credited Caster's turnaround to overcoming his lack of control and adding a slow knuckleball to his blazing fastball and sharp-breaking curve. Caster later wrote an article describing the role of his knuckler:

"My knuckle ball is thrown with the fingertips of my index and second finger on my right hand in contact with the smooth surface of the ball – no seems touched... I have found when pitching against the wind the ball seems to be most effective because it seems to 'flutter'... I regard the fast ball as my best pitch, with my knuckle ball as the change pitch."

After a strong showing in Portland in 1936, Caster was recalled by the A's for the 1937 season. He remained with Philadelphia for four years, compiling a 41–67 record and 4.94 ERA from 1937 to 1940. He twice led the American League in losses, with records of 16–20 in 1938 and 4–19 in 1940.

Despite losing 20 games in 1938, his ERA was significantly lower than the league average, and his record is largely attributable to playing for an eighth place team that finished with a 53–99 record. Indeed, after the 1938 season, multiple teams proposed trades for Caster, but owner Connie Mack designated Caster as "not for sale." UPI writer Paul Scheffels described Caster's approach this way: "This 6-foot-1-inch righthander from California has a delivery as simple as a fat woman's diet. He throws a fastball, a hook and when the 'jam comes up,' a knuckler." Caster also became known for entertaining his Philadelphia teammates with his imitations of "snaggle-toothed" monsters.

In 1939, Caster pitched on opening day for the Athletics against the Washington Senators in Washington, D.C. President Franklin Roosevelt attended the game, in which Caster pitched a shutout; Caster later described the opening day shutout in front of the President as one of the greatest thrills of his baseball career. Caster is also remembered as the pitcher who gave up Jimmie Foxx's milestone 500th home run on September 24, 1940.

=== St. Louis Browns ===
On November 16, 1940, Caster was selected off waivers by the St. Louis Browns from Philadelphia. In 1941, Luke Sewell converted Caster into a relief pitcher, and he had the best seasons of his major league career as the Browns' lead reliever from 1942 to 1944. As a reliever, his Adjusted ERA+ ratings skyrocketed to 133, 159, and 150 between 1942 and 1944. Caster later noted that he enjoyed the role of being a relief pitcher: "I like to be in there when the going is tough, trying to save a game."

Caster compiled a 23–23 record and 3.24 ERA in the four years from 1941 to 1945. He helped the 1944 St. Louis Browns win the American League pennant as he led the league with 12 saves and had an Adjusted ERA+ of 150, but he did not pitch in the World Series.

Caster began the 1945 season with St. Louis and had a 6.84 ERA after pitching 15 2/3 innings. The Browns waived him during the season.

=== Detroit Tigers ===
On August 8, 1945, Caster was selected off waivers by the Detroit Tigers from the Browns. Caster won five straight games for Detroit before finally losing a game. The 1945 Tigers went on to win the American League pennant and defeated the Chicago Cubs in the World Series. Caster appeared in 22 games for the 1945 Tigers, all in relief, compiling a 5–1 record and 3.86 ERA in 51 1/3 innings. He also pitched 2/3 of an inning of no-hit baseball in the World Series. In a lengthy feature story on Caster at the end of the regular season, The Sporting News credited Caster's contributions with this headline: "Caster Helps to Keep Tiger Wagon Rolling With Smooth Relief Hurling: 36-Year Fireman Cops Five Straight in Smothering Blazes."

Caster returned to the Tigers in 1946 and compiled a 2–1 record (5.66 ERA) in 26 relief appearances. He pitched his final major league game on September 16, 1946, at age 39.

=== Return to minor leagues ===
On December 12, 1946, Caster was released by the Tigers. He played for San Diego and Hollywood in the Pacific Coast League during the 1947 season. In 1948, he was a player/manager for the Riverside Rubes in the Sunset League. He attempted a comeback five years later, serving as a player-coach and appearing in eight games for the Edmonton Eskimos of the Western International League in 1953.

== Personal life and death ==
Caster and Daisy Jennie Herlinger married in November 1929. They had two daughters, born in 1933 and 1935.

Caster's father, Ira, was employed by the San Bernardino Sheriff's Department and became the chief criminal deputy in the 1930s. Caster also worked as a deputy sheriff for the San Bernardino Sheriff's Department in the off-season during his baseball career.

Caster died in 1955 at age 48 in Lakewood, California. He suffered a heart attack while attending a Christmas party hosted by his employer Douglas Aircraft Company. He had worked for the company as a milling machine operator.

== See also ==
- List of Major League Baseball annual saves leaders
