= Central California League =

- Classification: Class D (1910–1911)
- Sport: Minor League Baseball
- First season: 1910
- Folded: July 9, 1911
- President: E.H. Raymond (1910); D.C. Anderson (1910–1911); E.T. Shortall (1910–1911)
- No. of teams: 15
- Country: United States of America
- Most titles: 1 Alameda Alerts (1910); San Leandro Cherry Pickers (1911)
- Related competitions: Southern California Trolley League

The Central California League was a minor league baseball league that played in the 1910 and 1911 seasons. The Class D level league franchises were based exclusively in California. The league had a multitude of franchise relocations, before it permanently folded during the 1911 season. The 1910 Alameda Alerts and 1911 San Leandro Cherry Pickers captured league championships.

== History ==
The league franchises were unstable during two seasons of play. The league began play on April 17, 1910, and played through November 6, 1910. Of the eight original teams that started 1910 league play, seven of the eight teams moved during the season, with three teams moving twice or more, while three teams disbanded. In all, 15 different sites were used in the 1910 season, with two cities hosting two different Central California League teams. In 1911, two teams moved and two folded before the league permanently folded on July 9, 1911. The league played a full schedule, but only the weekend games counted in the standings.

== Cities represented ==
- Alameda, California: Alameda Bracketts (1910); Alameda Alerts (1910–1911); Alameda Monday Models (1911)
- Berkeley, California: Berkeley (1910); Berkeley Clarions (1911)
- Elmhurst, California: Elmhurst (1910); Elmhurst Carroll & Tilden (1911)
- Fruitvale, California: Fruitvale (1910); Fruitvale Travelers (1911)
- Hayward, California: Hayward (1910); Hayward Cubs (1911)
- Healdsburg, California: Healdsburg Grapevines (1910)
- Napa, California: Nampa (1910)
- Oakland, California: Oakland Basches (1910); Oakland Emery Arms (1911)
- Petaluma, California: Petaluma Incubators (1910)
- Richmond, California: Richmond Merchants (1910–1911)
- St. Helena, California: St. Helena (1910)
- San Leandro, California: San Leandro Grapevines (1910); San Leandro Cherry Pickers (1911)
- San Rafael, California: San Rafael (1910)
- Santa Rosa, California: Santa Rosa Prune Pickers (1910)
- Vallejo, California: Vallejo (1910); Vallejo Pastimes (1911)

== Standings & statistics ==
1910 Central California League

| Team standings | W | L | PCT | GB | Managers |
|---|---|---|---|---|---|
| Richmond Merchants | 18 | 10 | .643 | – | John Luce |
| Healdsburg Grapevines / San Leandro Grapevines | 17 | 11 | .607 | 1 | Pop Wieland |
| St. Helena; Fruitvale / Alameda Alerts | 19 | 13 | .594 | 1 | Nathan Coombs |
| Santa Rosa Prune Pickers / Alameda Bracketts / Oakland Basches / Berkeley | 14 | 15 | .483 | 4½ | William Bailey / Tom Walton |
| Petaluma Incubators / Elmhurst | 8 | 18 | .308 | 9 | Dennis Healy / W.D. Thomas |
| San Rafael / Hayward / Fruitvale | 7 | 17 | .292 | 9 | George Englefield / William Hull; C. Heyer |
| Vallejo | 4 | 2 | .667 | NA | Charles McCauley |
| Nampa | 3 | 4 | .429 | NA | Earl Raymond |

The league played a full schedule but only the weekend games counted in the standings.
Healdsburg moved to San Leandro April 24; St. Helena moved to Fruitvale April 24, then to Alameda July 10; Santa Rosa moved to Alameda May 5, then to Oakland July 10, then to Berkeley July 31.
Valleyjo and Napa disbanded May 29; Petaluma moved to Elmhurst June 5; San Rafael moved to Hayward June 12, then to Fruitvale July 10. Fruitvale disbanded October 9.
Playoff: Alameda Alerts 2 games, Richmond 0.

1911 Central California League
schedule

| Team standings | W | L | PCT | GB | Managers |
|---|---|---|---|---|---|
| San Leandro Cherry Pickers | 10 | 3 | .769 | – | Pop Wieland |
| Alameda Alerts | 8 | 5 | .615 | 2 | Tom Walton |
| Vallejo Pastimes | 8 | 5 | .615 | 2 | Dave Orr |
| Richmond Merchants | 8 | 6 | .571 | 2½ | John Luce |
| Berkeley Clarions | 5 | 6 | .455 | 4 | Jim Kane |
| Elmhurst Carroll Tildens / Oakland Emery Arms | 4 | 7 | .364 | 5 | George Worthington |
| Hayward Cubs | 4 | 9 | .308 | 6 | Len Schroeder |
| Fruitvale Travelers / Alameda Monday Models | 4 | 10 | .286 | 6½ | NA |

Fruitvale (1–7) moved to Alameda May 28; Elmhurst moved to Oakland June 4, disbanded June 18; Berkeley disbanded June 23
The league disbanded July 9.
