= Mike Hunt (baseball) =

American professional baseball player

- Outfielder
- Born: October 12, 1907; Santa Clara, California, U.S.
- Died: November 25, 1996 (aged 89); Federal Way, Washington, U.S.
- Batted: Right Threw: Right
- Stats at Baseball Reference

Arthur Leland "Mike" Hunt (October 12, 1907 – November 25, 1996) was an American professional baseball outfielder who spent 12 seasons playing minor league baseball, mostly in the Pacific Coast League. He hit over 200 career home runs. Nicknamed "Moose" and "Old Baggy Pants," he was considered "Seattle’s premier slugger of the 1930s."

He began his career in 1927 with the Pocatello Bannocks and played for the San Bernardino Padres (1929), Tucson Cowboys (1929) and Globe Bears before joining the PCL in 1930. He played for the Mission Reds and San Francisco Seals that year. He was with San Francisco in 1931 and 1932, Mission, San Francisco, the Oakland Oaks and the Atlanta Crackers of the Southern Association in 1933, San Francisco and the Seattle Indians in 1934 and Seattle from 1935 to 1939. They became the Seattle Rainiers in 1938.

Hunt hit .348 with 116 hits in 89 games in 1929. In 1930, he hit .340 with 23 home runs in 123 games. He hit .303 in 1931 and .316 with 14 home runs in 1932. In 1933, he hit .300 and in 1934, he broke out by hitting .346 with 30 home runs, 223 hits and 42 doubles in 175 games. In 1935, he .330 with 25 home runs, 45 doubles and 211 hits in 163 games. In 1936, he hit .316 with 30 home runs, 50 doubles and 212 hits in 169 games and in 1937, he batted .312 with a career-high 39 home runs with 43 doubles and 202 hits. In 1938, he hit .291 with 13 home runs in 157 games. After hitting .259 with 15 home runs in 121 games in 1939, Hunt's playing career ended. He led the PCL in home runs and RBI in 1936 and 1937.

Hunt married his wife at Civic Field in Seattle 1937. They had one son and three grandchildren. He died in 1996.
