= Judge Nagle =

American baseball player (1880–1971)

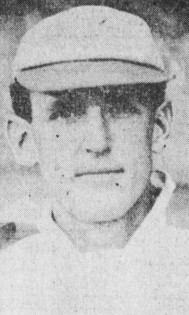
- Pitcher
- Born: March 10, 1880; Santa Rosa, California, US
- Died: May 26, 1971 (aged 91); Santa Rosa, California, US
- Batted: Right Threw: Right

MLB debut
- April 26, 1911, for the Pittsburgh Pirates

Last MLB appearance
- September 4, 1911, for the Boston Red Sox

MLB statistics
- Win–loss record: 5–3
- Earned run average: 3.48
- Strikeouts: 23

Teams
- Pittsburgh Pirates (1911); Boston Red Sox (1911)

Walter Harold Nagle [Lucky] (March 10, 1880 – May 26, 1971) was a pitcher in Major League Baseball who played for the Pittsburgh Pirates and Boston Red Sox during the 1911 season. Listed at 6 ft 0 in (1.83 m), 176 lb., Nagle batted and threw right-handed. He was born in Santa Rosa, California.

In one season career, Nagle posted a 5–3 record with a 3.48 ERA in 13 appearances, including four starts, one complete game, one save, 23 strikeouts, 12 walks, 60 hits allowed, and 54⅓ innings of work. He later was player/manager of the San Jose Bears in the California State League in 1913.

Nagle wrote a book, titled Five Straight Errors On Ladies Day, about his life experiences including his friendship with baseball legend Ty Cobb.

Nagle died at the age of 91 in his homeland of Santa Rosa, California. (obit in "Santa Rosa Recorder", 27 May 1971)
