= George Harper (pitcher) =

American baseball player (1866–1931)

- Pitcher
- Born: August 17, 1866; Milwaukee, Wisconsin, U.S.
- Died: December 11, 1931 (aged 65); Stockton, California, U.S.
- Batted: Right Threw: Right

MLB debut
- July 11, 1894, for the Philadelphia Phillies

Last MLB appearance
- September 1, 1896, for the Brooklyn Bridegrooms

MLB statistics
- Win–loss record: 10-14
- Earned run average: 5.43
- Strikeouts: 46
- Stats at Baseball Reference

Teams
- Philadelphia Phillies (1894); Brooklyn Bridegrooms (1896)

George B. Harper (August 17, 1866 in Milwaukee, Wisconsin – December 11, 1931 in Stockton, California) was an American pitcher for Major League Baseball in the 19th century. He played in 12 games for the Philadelphia Phillies during the 1894 season and 16 games for the Brooklyn Bridegrooms during the 1896 season. His minor league career lasted from 1886 through 1901, mostly in the California League. He managed the Stockton Millers in 1914.

== Sources ==
- Career statistics from Baseball Reference · Baseball Reference (Minors) · Retrosheet · Baseball Almanac
