= San Jose Prune Pickers =

- 1885–1915; (1885, 1891–1892, 1895–1896, 1898–1899, 1903–1915); San Jose, California

Minor league affiliations
- Previous classes: Class-D (1910–1915); Independent (1904, 1906–1909, 1899–1900); Class-E (1899); Class-D (1898); Class-F (1898); Class-B (1892)
- Previous leagues: California State League (1885, 1903–1906, 1910–1915); California League (1891–1892, 1896, 1898–1899, 1906–1909); Pacific Coast League (1898); Pacific Northwest League (1898); California Winter League (1895)

Minor league titles
- League titles: 1913

Team data
- Previous names: San Jose Bears (1913–1915); San Jose Prune Pickers (1906–1910); San Jose Brewers (1899); San Jose Dukes (1891–1892); San Jose Athletics (1885)

The San Jose Prune Pickers (also called the Bears, Fullers, Brewers, Dukes, Athletics and simply San Jose Baseball Club) were a minor league baseball team located in San Jose, California. They competed in the California League and its various offshoots and predecessors on and off from 1885 through 1915.

The city would later be represented in the minor leagues by the San Jose Red Sox and San Jose Giants.
