= Ned Porter (baseball) =

American baseball player (1905-1968)

- Pitcher
- Born: July 6, 1905; Apalachicola, Florida, U.S.
- Died: June 30, 1968 (aged 62); Gainesville, Florida, U.S.
- Batted: Right Threw: Right

MLB debut
- August 7, 1926, for the New York Giants

Last MLB appearance
- May 2, 1927, for the New York Giants

MLB statistics
- Win–loss record: 0–0
- Earned run average: 2.25
- Strikeouts: 1
- Stats at Baseball Reference

Teams
- New York Giants (1926–1927)

Ned Swindell Porter (July 6, 1905 – June 30, 1968) was an American professional baseball player. He was a right-handed pitcher over parts of the 1926 and 1927 seasons with the New York Giants. For his career, he did not record a decision and compiled a 2.25 earned run average, with one strikeout in 4 innings pitched.

Porter was born in Apalachicola, Florida in 1905. He attended the University of Florida in Gainesville, Florida, where he played for coach James L. White and coach Lance Richbourg's Florida Gators baseball team from 1924 to 1926.

Porter died in Gainesville, Florida in 1968; he was 62 years old.

== See also ==
- List of Florida Gators baseball players
