= Henry Schmidt (baseball) =

American baseball player (1873-1926)

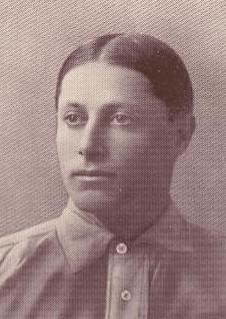
- Pitcher
- Born: June 26, 1873; Brownsville, Texas, U.S.
- Died: April 23, 1926 (aged 52); Nashville, Tennessee, U.S.
- Batted: Right Threw: Right

MLB debut
- April 17, 1903, for the Brooklyn Superbas

Last MLB appearance
- September 22, 1903, for the Brooklyn Superbas

MLB statistics
- Win–loss record: 22–13
- Earned run average: 3.83
- Strikeouts: 96
- Stats at Baseball Reference

Teams
- Brooklyn Superbas (1903)

Henry Martin Schmidt (June 26, 1873 – April 23, 1926) was an American professional baseball pitcher for the Brooklyn Superbas during the 1903 season. A star in the minor leagues, he was acquired by Brooklyn and won 22 games during his single season there. The Superbas wanted him back for 1904, but he declined, sending a note to the team (with the unsigned contract for the 1904 season) that declared, "I do not like living in the East and will not report." His 22 wins is the most by a pitcher who only played one Major League season.

He returned to the Pacific Coast League and continued his career in the minors. In 1908, while pitching for the Greensboro, North Carolina club of the Carolina Association, Schmidt was shot in the pitching arm as well as the leg and left shoulder. The injury ended his season and he did not appear in another professional baseball game in his career.

After his baseball career he reportedly made a living selling fabrics.

Preceded by Wild Bill Donovan	Brooklyn Superbas Opening Day; Starting pitcher 1903	Succeeded by Oscar Jones
