= San Francisco baseball team (California League) =

San Francisco
- 1878–1915; (1878–1896, 1898–1910, 1915); San Francisco, California

Minor league affiliations
- Previous classes: Class D (1898, 1910, 1915); Class B (1892)
- Previous leagues: California League (1879–1893, 1896, 1898–1902, 1906–1909); California State League (1883, 1885–1886, 1888, 1892, 1903–1905, 1910, 1915); Pacific Coast League (1887, 1898); San Francisco City League (1896); California Winter League (1895); California Players' League (1894); Central California League (1892); New California League (1881); Pacific League (1878–1880)

Team data
- Previous names: San Francisco Baby Seals (1910); San Francisco Orphans (1906–1909); San Francisco Pirates (1903); San Francisco Wasps (1901); San Francisco Brewers (1900); San Francisco A's (1899); San Francisco Athletics (1878–1879, 1881, 1898); San Francisco Metropolitans (1891–1892, 1896, 1898); California of San Francisco (1896); Imperial of San Francisco (1896); Pacific of San Francisco (1896); Imperials of San Francisco (1896); San Francisco Californians (1879–1881, 1883, 1886, 1896); San Francisco Hot Peanuts (1894); San Francisco Friscos (1891, 1893); San Francisco Haverlys (1883–1890, 1892); San Francisco Folgers (1892); San Francisco Emersons (1888); San Francisco Pioneers (1886–1888); San Francisco Damianas (1886–1887); San Francisco A & G's (1887); San Francisco Knickerbockers (1879, 1881, 1886); San Francisco Star (1879, 1885–1886); San Francisco Occidental (1884–1885); San Francisco Niantic (1883); San Francisco Woonsocket (1883); San Francisco Reddingtons (1883); San Francisco Nationals (1882); San Francisco Reno (1878–1879, 1881); San Francisco Mystics (1881); San Francisco Bay City (1879–1880); San Francisco Unions (1879); San Francisco Mutals (1879); San Francisco Eagles (1878–1879)

A number of different minor league baseball teams have played in San Francisco, California from 1878 through the arrival of the Major League San Francisco Giants in 1958. The most notable team was the San Francisco Seals of the Pacific Coast League but prior to their formation in 1903 a number of teams operated primarily in the California League and its various predecessors and offshoots, including multiple teams in the same league at various times.
