= California State League =

Californian minor state league baseball

- Classification: Class D (1910, 1913–1915, 1929)
- Sport: Minor League Baseball
- First season: 1910
- Folded: 1929
- President: Frank Herman (1910); Allan T. Baum (1913–1914); Louis Schroeder (1915); Orville McPherson (1929)
- No. of teams: 17
- Country: United States of America
- Most titles: 2 Stockton Millers (1910) Stockton Producers (1913)
- Related competitions: California League

The California State League is a minor baseball league operating in California and the Pacific coast. While there were at least three Class D California State Leagues that operated at different points in minor league baseball history, two of the leagues (1910 and 1929) existed for only a single season. The third league operated for three seasons, from 1913 to 1915.

The 1910 version was Class B until 6 June 1910, after which it became Class D. Sacramento and San Francisco dropped out on 31 May 1910, and Oakland moved to Merced on 7 June 1910. Fresno then disbanded 24 June 1910, causing the league to cease operations.

The league was re-established for the 1913 season, then disbanded again on 1 June 1914. When it was re-established in 1915, the league would be disbanded on 30 May due to inclement weather and the teams having played only 5 to 7 games.

The 1929 league, which was based in Southern California, lasted until 17 June, where teams played around 50 games.

== Teams by City ==
| City | Team(s) | Year(s) Active |
|---|---|---|
| Alameda | Alameda | 1915 |
| Bakersfield | Bakersfield Bees | 1929 |
| Berkeley | Berkeley | 1915 |
| Coronado | Coronado Arabs | 1929 |
| Fresno | Fresno Tigers^{1,3}, Fresno Packers^{2} | 1910^{1}, 1913^{2}, 1914^{3} |
| Merced | Merced Fig Growers | 1910 |
| Modesto | Modesto Reds | 1914, 1915 |
| Oakland | Oakland Invaders^{1}, Oakland Commuters^{2} | 1910^{1}, 1915^{2} |
| Pomona | Pomona Arabs | 1929 |
| Sacramento | Sacramento Baby Senators | 1910 |
| San Francisco | San Francisco Baby Seals^{1}, San Francisco^{2} | 1910^{1}, 1915^{2} |
| San Diego | San Diego Aces | 1929 |
| San Jose | San Jose Prune Pickers^{1}, San Jose Bears^{2} | 1910^{1}, 1913 - 1915^{2} |
| Santa Ana | Santa Ana Orange Countians | 1929 |
| Stockton | Stockton Millers^{1, 3}, Stockton Producers^{2} | 1910^{1}, 1913^{2}, 1914 - 1915^{3} |
| Vallejo | Vallejo Marines | 1913 |
| Watsonville | Watsonville Pippins | 1913 |

== Statistics by League Year ==
=== 1910 California State League ===
| Team Standings | W | L | PCT | GB | Managers |
|---|---|---|---|---|---|
| Stockton Millers | 33 | 19 | .635 | – | Jimmy McCall |
| Fresno Tigers | 32 | 21 | .604 | 1½ | Ed McDonough |
| Oakland Invaders / Merced Fig Growers | 25 | 25 | .500 | 7 | Cy Mooreing |
| San Jose Prune Pickers | 22 | 30 | .423 | 11 | Willis Browne |
| Sacramento Baby Senators | 16 | 23 | .410 | NA | Charles Doyle |
| San Francisco Baby Seals | 14 | 24 | .368 | NA | Tommy Sheehan |

Player Statistics
| Player | Team | Stat | Tot | Player | Team | Stat | Tot |
|---|---|---|---|---|---|---|---|
| Ed McDonough | Fresno | BA | .349 | Oscar Jones | Fresno | W | 16 |
| Gene Kratzberg | Stockton | Pct | .733; 11–4 | | | | |

=== 1913 California State League ===
| Team Standings | W | L | PCT | GB | Managers |
|---|---|---|---|---|---|
| Stockton Producers | 79 | 44 | .642 | – | Blaine Thomas |
| Fresno Packers | 73 | 50 | .593 | 6 | George Wheeler |
| Vallejo / Watsonville | 52 | 71 | .423 | 27 | Brick Devereaux |
| San Jose Bears | 42 | 81 | .341 | 37 | Judge Nagle |

Vallejo moved to Watsonville on 6 July 1913.

Player Statistics
| Player | Team | Stat | Tot | Player | Team | Stat | Tot |
|---|---|---|---|---|---|---|---|
| Happy Smith | San Jose | BA | .323 | Nelson Jones | Stockton | W | 24 |
| Tom Pierce | Fresno | Runs | 87 | Ashley Pope | Stockton | SO | 235 |
| Joe Wilhoit | Stockton | Hits | 158 | Nelson Jones | Stockton | Pct | .750; 24–8 |
| Rinaldo Williams | Vallejo/Watson | HR | 7 | | | | |

=== 1914 California State League ===
| Team Standings | W | L | PCT | GB | Managers |
|---|---|---|---|---|---|
| Fresno Tigers | 20 | 15 | .571 | – | George Wheeler |
| San Jose Bears | 20 | 16 | .556 | ½ | Mike Steffani |
| Stockton Millers | 17 | 19 | .472 | 3½ | George Harper |
| Modesto Reds | 14 | 21 | .400 | 6 | Jim Byrnes |

Player Statistics
| Player | Team | Stat | Tot | Player | Team | Stat | Tot |
|---|---|---|---|---|---|---|---|
| Tony Boeckel | Stockton | BA | .364 | Horace Miller | Fresno | W | 9 |
| Tony Boeckel | Stockton | Runs | 25 | Walt Waldschmidt | Fresno | SO | 75 |
| Tony Boeckel | Stockton | Hits | 51 | Harry Stewart | San Jose | Pct | 1.000; 8–0 |
| Tom Pierce | Fresno | HR | 2 | | | | |

=== 1915 California State League ===
| Team Standings | W | L | PCT | GB | Managers |
|---|---|---|---|---|---|
| Modesto Reds | 6 | 1 | .857 | – | Jack Lesher |
| San Jose Bears | 4 | 1 | .800 | 1 | Mike Steffani |
| Oakland Commuters | 2 | 3 | .400 | 3 | Walt McMemony |
| Alameda | 2 | 3 | .400 | 3 | Billy Hammond |
| Stockton Millers | 2 | 4 | .333 | 3½ | Buck Francks |
| Berkeley / San Francisco | 1 | 5 | .167 | 4½ | C.W. Brainard / Joe Solari |

Berkeley (0–2) moved to San Francisco April 28. No player statistics are available.

=== 1929 California State League ===
| Team Standings | W | L | PCT | GB | Managers |
|---|---|---|---|---|---|
| San Diego Aces | 34 | 25 | .576 | – | Sam Agnew |
| Bakersfield Bees | 32 | 28 | .533 | 2½ | Louis Guisto / Ned Porter |
| San Bernardino Padres | 32 | 29 | .525 | 3 | Rube Ellis |
| Santa Ana / Pomona / Coronado | 22 | 38 | .367 | 12½ | Jess Orndorf / Pinch Thomas |

Santa Ana (4–20) moved to Pomona on 8 May 1929, having played six games at San Bernardino. Pomona (2–4) moved to Coronado County on 15 May 1929, having played their games at the San Diego ball park.

Player Statistics
| Player | Team | Stat | Tot | Player | Team | Stat | Tot |
|---|---|---|---|---|---|---|---|
| Lou Martin | Bakersfield | BA | .389 | George Caster | San Bernardino | W | 12 |
| Ned Porter | Bakersfield | Runs | 63 | George Caster | San Bernardino | SO | 80 |
| L.B. Tomlinson | Bakersfield | Hits | 83 | George Caster | San Bernardino | Pct | .706; 12–5 |
| Ned Porter | Bakersfield | HR | 15 | | | | |
