= Richmond Merchants =

- 1910–1911; Richmond, California

Minor league affiliations
- Class: Class D (1910–1911)
- League: Central California League (1910–1911)

Major league affiliations
- Team: None

Minor league titles
- League titles (0): None
- Conference titles (1): 1910

Team data
- Name: Richmond Merchants (1910–1911)
- Ballpark: Unknown (1910–1911)

The Richmond Merchants were a minor league baseball team based in Richmond, California. In the 1910 and 1911 seasons, the Merchants played as members of the Class D level Central California League, winning the league pennant in the 1910 season.

== History ==
Minor league baseball play was first hosted in Richmond, California in 1910. The Richmond "Merchants" team became members of the eight–team Class D level Central California League.

While Richmond remained stable during the two seasons of the Central California League, the other league franchises relocated often. The Central California League began play on April 17, 1910, and played through November 6, 1910. Of the eight Central California League teams that started 1910, including Richmond, seven moved during the year, three of them moved twice or more and three teams disbanded during the season. In all, 15 different sites were used in 1910, with two cities having two different teams.

The league played a full schedule, but only the weekend games counted in the standings.

The 1910 Richmond Merchants won the Central California League pennant. Playing the season under manager John Luce, the Merchants ended the regular season with a record of 18–10, finishing 1.0 game ahead of the second place Alameda Alerts. In the playoff finals, the Alameda Alerts defeated Richmond 2 games to 0.

In the 1911 season, two Central California League teams moved and two folded before the league permanently folded on July 9, 1911. Richmond continued Central California League play in 1911, before the league folded during its second season. After beginning play on April 8, 1911, the league folded on July 9, 1911, with Richmond in fourth place. The Merchants had a record of 8–6, playing under returning manager John Luce. Richmond finished 2½ games behind the first place San Leandro Cherry Pickers.

The Central California League did not return to play in 1912. Richmond, California has not hosted another minor league baseball franchise.

== The ballpark ==
The name of the home minor league ballpark in Richmond in 1910 and 1911 is unknown.

== Timeline ==
Year(s)	# Yrs.	Team	Level	League
1910–1911	2	Richmond Merchants	Class D	Central California League

== Year–by–year records ==
Year	Record	Finish	Manager	Playoffs/notes
1910	18–10	1st	John Luce	Won pennant Lost to Alameda in Finals
1911	8–6	4th	John Luce	League folded July 9

== Notable alumni ==
The player rosters for the 1910 and 1911 Richmond Merchants teams are unknown.
