= San Leandro Cherry Pickers =

- 1910–1911; San Leandro, California

Minor league affiliations
- Class: Class D (1910–1911)
- League: Central California League (1910–1911)

Major league affiliations
- Team: None

Minor league titles
- League titles (1): 1911

Team data
- Name: San Leandro Grapevines (1910); San Leandro Cherry Pickers (1911)
- Ballpark: San Leandro Park (1910–1911)

The San Leandro Cherry Pickers were a minor league baseball team based in San Leandro, California. In 1910 and 1911, San Leandro teams played as members of the Class D level Central California League, with the Cherry Pickers winning the 1911 championship, as the league permanently folded during the season. The 1910 "San Leandro Grapevines" played a partial season, when the Healdsburg team relocated to San Leandro. Pop Wieland managed the team in both seasons. San Leandro hosted minor league home games at San Leandro Park

== History ==
In 1909, San Leandro hosted a semi–professional team, playing in the Transbay League.

The 1910 San Leandro "Grapevines" began minor league play in the Class D level Central California League during the season. On April 24, 1910, Healdsburg moved to San Leandro, a week after the league began play on April 17, 1910.

When the Central California League ended their season on November 6, 1910, the Healdsburg/San Leandro Grapevines were in second place. The Grapevines ended the Central California League regular season with a record of 17–11, finishing 1.0 game behind the first place Richmond Merchants, as Pop Wieland served as manager.

With Pop Wieland returning as manager, the 1911 San Leandro "Cherry Pickers" continued Central California League play and won a championship in a shortened season. When the league folded, San Leandro ended their 1911 season with a record of 10–3, while in first place in the final standings. After beginning play on April 9, 1911, the Central California League permanently folded on July 9, 1911, with the Cherry Pickers 2.0 games ahead of the second place Alameda Alerts.

The Central California League did not return to play in 1912. San Leandro has not hosted another minor league team.

== The ballpark ==
The San Leandro teams hosted 1910 and 1911 home minor league games at San Leandro Park. The ballpark was located at Martinez Street & Estudillo Street. Today, there is a plaque marking the location, with the inscription indicating the ballpark was built in 1909.

== Timeline ==
Year(s)	# Yrs.	Team	Level	League	Ballpark
1910	1	San Leandro Grapevines	Class D	Central California League	San Leandro Park
1911	1	San Leandro Cherry Pickers	Class D	Central California League	San Leandro Park

== Year–by–year records ==
Year	Record	Finish	Manager	Playoffs/Notes
1910	17–11	2nd	Pop Wieland	Healdsburg moved San Leandro April 24
1911	10–3	1st	Pop Wieland	League champions League folded July 9

== Notable alumni ==
- Complete player roster information for the San Leandro teams is not known.
