= California Winter League =

First integrated U.S. baseball league

California Winter League is a former baseball winter league. It was the first integrated league in the 20th century as players from Major League Baseball and Negro league baseball played each other in training games. The league was in existence from the turn of the 20th century to 1947.

== Events leading to formation ==
The California League, which began in 1879, had a four-year interruption and in 1895, four teams started playing during the winter months. The teams, located in Los Angeles, Oakland, San Francisco and San Jose played for one month but by 1897 the Northern California Winter League was formed. It consisted of teams located in four cities: Oakland, Sacramento, San Francisco and Sacramento. and began as the Southern California Winter League before its name was shortened. By 1915, the California League had folded, unable to withstand competition from the Pacific Coast League (PCL). The California Winter League, originally known as the Southern California Winter League, began as a semi-pro level league in 1900 and was graded at "probably Class A level by 1910." Eleven all-white teams opened the 1906–07 season. Teams included: Anaheim, Fullerton, Hamburgers, Hoegee Flags, Los Angeles Morans, Los Angeles Pacifics, Pasadena, San Bernardino, San Diego, Santa Barbara, and Tufts-Lyons. To begin the 1908–09 season, the league comprised 11 teams, including the Santa Ana Yellow Sox who featured starting pitcher Walter Johnson.

== Integration (1910) ==
In 1909, black players would arrive to the state and play in the California Winter League. Negro league teams, including Rube Foster's Leland Giants, would go west for the winter and play top white teams. While the teams were not integrated, this made the California Winter League the first integrated league in the U.S. in the 20th century. The Giants were the first Negro league team to join the league during the 1910–11 season.

Black teams hesitated to travel to California to play in games during periods of the league's existence, such as 1917–1919 when black players were not allowed to play in PCL ball parks. White players risked being barred from participating in games at times due to prohibition by Commissioner of Baseball Kenesaw Mountain Landis, who was staunchly against integration.

The Philadelphia Royal Giants were the Negro league team which won the most number of championships, nine.

== Notable players ==
Among the Hall of Famers to appear in the California Winter League were Johnson, Satchel Paige, Stan Musial, Turkey Stearnes, Arky Vaughan, Smokey Joe Williams, Bob Feller, Bullet Joe Rogan, Kiki Cuyler, Rube Foster, Dizzy Dean, Buck Leonard, Ted Williams, Jimmie Foxx, Dave Bancroft, Willie Foster, Earl Averill Sr., Bob Lemon, Cool Papa Bell, Ralph Kiner, Heinie Manush, Hilton Smith, Red Ruffing and Max Carey. Other stars included Dobie Moore, Babe Herman, Chet Brewer, Mule Suttles, Bob Meusel, Bill Wright, Dazzy Vance, Wally Berger, Biz Mackey, Sammy T. Hughes, Newt Allen, Sammy Bankhead, John Beckwith, Tank Carr and Gavvy Cravath. The most prominent individual in the league's history was Joe Pirrone. Schedules were usually about 10–20 games, with white teams often taking turns against the black team. Some years the league consisted only of one black team and one white team. At its peak, the league talent level has been estimated to be between AA and AAA.

== Demise ==
The league finished its run in 1946; the integration of Major League Baseball, increased exhibition contests between black and white players and limiting rules by long-time league opponent Landis helped end its history.

== All-time leaders ==
- Batting Average - Dobie Moore - .385
- Home Runs - Mule Suttles - 64
- Wins - Satchel Paige - 56
- Strikeouts - Satchel Paige - 766

== Notes and references ==
- Source: "The California Winter League" by William McNeil
