= Fresno Tigers =

- 1908–1914; (1908-1910, 1913-1914); Fresno, California

Minor league affiliations
- Previous classes: D (1910, 1913-1914)
- League: California State League (1910, 1913-1914)
- Previous leagues: California League (1908-1909)

Team data
- Previous names: Fresno Tigers (1914); Fresno Packers (1913); Fresno Tigers (1910); Fresno Raisin Growers (1909); Fresno Tigers (1908)

The Fresno Tigers (also occasionally known as the Packers and Raisin Growers) were a minor league baseball team which played in the California League and California State League from 1908 to 1914, while representing the city of Fresno, California.
