= Bill Bailey (pitcher) =

American baseball player (1888–1926)

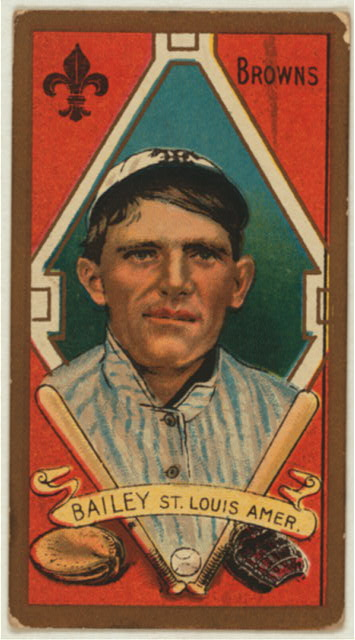
- Bailey in 1911
- Pitcher
- Born: April 12, 1888; Fort Smith, Arkansas, U.S.
- Died: November 2, 1926 (aged 38); Houston, Texas, U.S.
- Batted: Left Threw: Left

MLB debut
- September 11, 1907, for the St. Louis Browns

Last MLB appearance
- June 26, 1922, for the St. Louis Cardinals

MLB statistics
- Win–loss record: 38–76
- Earned run average: 3.57
- Strikeouts: 570
- Stats at Baseball Reference

Teams
- St. Louis Browns (1907–1912); Baltimore Terrapins (1914–1915); Chicago Whales (1915); Detroit Tigers (1918); St. Louis Cardinals (1921–1922)

William F. Bailey (April 12, 1888 – November 2, 1926) was an American left-handed pitcher in Major League Baseball. He played for the St. Louis Browns, Baltimore Terrapins, Chicago Whales, Detroit Tigers, and St. Louis Cardinals. He had a career record of 38–76 with a 3.57 earned run average (ERA).

== Career ==
Bailey first pitched in the major leagues in 1907 for the St. Louis Browns, and he remained with the team through the 1912 season. He had one of his best seasons in 1909, when he finished with a 9–10 win-loss record but a 2.44 ERA. The next year, Bailey's ERA increased to 3.32 but his win-loss record spiraled to 3-18 for a Browns team that finished with a 47-107-4 record.

In the inaugural Federal League season of 1914, Bailey struck out more than one batter per inning (131 strikeouts in 128 2/3 innings, or 9.2 strikeouts per 9 innings), a virtually unheard-of feat in that era. In the 1910–19 decade no other pitcher with at least 100 innings pitched even approached that level, with Rube Marquard (7.7 strikeouts per 9 innings in 1911) being second. Nonetheless, Bailey had a losing record (7–9) in that season.

In 1915, his second Federal League season, Bailey lost 20 games. He went 6–19 with a 4.63 ERA for the Baltimore Terrapins, was traded to the Chicago Whales, and went 3–1 with a 2.16 ERA for Chicago. After Bailey's two seasons in the Federal League, he pitched mostly in the minor leagues, with his only major league appearances coming in 1918 (8 games for the Detroit Tigers), 1921 (19 games for the St. Louis Cardinals), and 1922 (12 games for the Cardinals).

In Bailey's later minor league career, he lost 20 or more games two more times. In 1919, he went 24–21 with a 2.67 ERA for the Beaumont Oilers of the Texas League, with whom he played through 1921. In 1922, Bailey split his time between the Houston Buffaloes of the Texas League and the Omaha Buffaloes of the Western League. He had a combined 17–23 record that year with a 5.20 ERA. He last pitched with Omaha in the 1925 season.

== Death ==
Before Bailey could appear in any games in 1926, he developed intestinal bleeding and was admitted to Baptist Hospital in Houston, where he underwent blood transfusions. The Western League held a benefit in his honor. Bailey seemed to get better for a while, but he died that November while awaiting another transfusion.
