= Stockton Millers =

- 1886–1915; (1886, 1888–1891, 1893–1894, 1896, 1898, 1900, 1903–1910, 1913–1915); Stockton, California

Minor league affiliations
- Previous classes: Class-D (1913–1915); Independent (1904, 1906, 1907–1909); Class-D (1898)
- Previous leagues: California State League (1996, 1903–1906, 1910, 1913–1915); California League (1888–1890, 1893, 1896, 1898, 1900, 1906–1909); Pacific Coast League (1898); California Players' League (1894)

Team data
- Previous names: Stockton Millers (1914–1915); Stockton Producers (1913); Stockton Millers (1906–1910); Stockton Wasps (1900); Stockton Hayseeds (1894); Stockton River Pirates (1893)

The Stockton Millers were a minor league baseball team located in Stockton, California. They competed primarily in the California League between 1886 and 1915.
