= Oscar Jones =

American baseball player (1879-1953)

- Pitcher
- Born: October 22, 1879; Carter County, Missouri, U.S.
- Died: June 16, 1953 (aged 76); Fort Worth, Texas, U.S.
- Batted: Right Threw: Right

MLB debut
- April 20, 1903, for the Brooklyn Superbas

Last MLB appearance
- August 24, 1905, for the Brooklyn Superbas

MLB statistics
- Win–loss record: 44–54
- Earned run average: 3.20
- Strikeouts: 257
- Stats at Baseball Reference

Teams
- Brooklyn Superbas (1903–1905)

Oscar Lafayette Jones (October 22, 1879 – June 16, 1953), nicknamed "Flip Flop", was an American professional baseball pitcher in the Major Leagues from 1903 to 1905 for the Brooklyn Superbas.

Preceded by Henry Schmidt	Brooklyn Superbas Opening Day; Starting pitcher 1904–1905	Succeeded by Harry McIntire
