= Alameda baseball team =

Alameda Baseball Team
- 1906–1915; (1906–1908, 1910–1911, 1915); Alameda, California

Minor league affiliations
- Previous classes: Class D
- League: California State League (1915)
- Previous leagues: Central California League (1910–1911); California League (1906–1908); California State League (1906)

Team data
- Previous names: Alameda (1915); Alameda Monday Models (1911); Alameda Alerts (1910–1911); Alameda Bracketts (1910); Alameda Encinals (1908); Alameda Grays (1906–1907); Alameda (1906)
- Previous parks: Alameda Recreation Grounds

Several different minor league baseball teams played in the city of Alameda, California from 1906 to 1915.

These included:

- The Alameda Grays (1906–1907) and Alameda Encinals (1908) of the California League
- The Alameda Alerts (1910–1911), Alameda Bracketts (1911) and Alameda Monday Models (1911) of the Central California League.
- Two separate Alameda clubs that played in the California State League in 1906 and 1915.
