= Porterville Comets =

- 1911–1952; (1911, 1949–1950, 1952); Porterville, California

Minor league affiliations
- Previous classes: Class C (1949–1952); Class D (1911)
- Previous leagues: Southwest International League (1952); Sunset League (1949–1950); San Joaquin Valley League (1911)

Team data
- Previous names: Porterville Comets (1952); Porterville Packers (1949–1950); Porterville Orange Pickers (1911)
- Previous parks: Porterville Municipal Ball Park

The Porterville Comets were the last minor league baseball team that operated out of Porterville, California. They played in the Southwest International League in 1952 and were an all-black baseball team. Previously the Porterville Packers played in the Sunset League in 1949–1950 and the Porterville Orange Pickers played in the San Joaquin Valley League in 1911.
