= Coalinga Tigers =

- 1910–1911; Coalinga, California

Minor league affiliations
- Previous classes: Class D
- League: San Joaquin Valley League

Team data
- Previous names: Coalinga Tigers (1911); Coalinga Savages (1910)

The Coalinga Tigers (a.k.a. Savages) were a minor league baseball team in the Class D San Joaquin Valley League in 1910 and 1911.
