= California League =

Baseball league in California, US

- Current season, competition or edition: 2025 California League season
- Classification: Single-A (2021–present); Class A-Adv. (1990–2020); Class A (1963–1989); Class C (1941–1962)
- Sport: Baseball
- Founded: 1941 (85 years ago)
- No. of teams: 8
- Country: United States
- Most recent champion: Lake Elsinore Storm (2026)
- Most titles: San Jose Giants (13)

The California League is a Minor League Baseball league that operates in California. Having been classified as a low minor league throughout its existence, it operated at Class A-Advanced from 1990 until its demotion to Single-A following Major League Baseball's 2021 reorganization of the minor leagues. The league temporarily operated for the 2021 season as the Low-A West before re-assuming its original moniker in 2022.

Before the COVID-19 pandemic, league attendance continued to increase each season, with over one million fans attending games per year, part of a general nationwide growth and expansion to smaller towns, cities, and regions below those in the National League or American League with Minor League Baseball at various levels of play in growing popularity in the last few decades.

== History ==
There were various attempts in the late 1800s and early 1900s to form a "California League" on the West Coast. At the time, the major leagues only had teams as far west as St. Louis and were restricted at first until World War I by long-distance train travel. The first organized California League lasted from 1887 to 1889, then another followed in 1891, and 1893, and finally in 1899–1902. After the National Association of Professional Baseball Leagues, an organization of minor leagues was formed in 1902, (following the "truce" and agreements between the older National League of 1876 and the newly "upstart" American League of 1901), the California League operated outside the NAPBL system as an independent league in 1902 and again from 1907 to 1909. This led to huge differences in the quality of teams competing with each other. In 1907, the San Francisco team was 3–34, while later in 1908 San Francisco was 9–67 and Oakland was 4–71. Oakland and San Francisco competed in every year of these various state leagues, with San Francisco having two teams during 1887–88.

The latest version of the California League was founded in 1941, and included teams in Anaheim, Bakersfield, Fresno, Merced, Riverside, San Bernardino, Santa Barbara, and Stockton. The following year, as a result of World War II, the league dropped to four teams, then suspended operations altogether, although major league baseball and some minor leagues continued as much as possible with limited availability of players during the war years. It reorganized and came back in 1946, adding teams in Visalia, San Jose, and Ventura by 1947. Further east, Reno, Nevada joined the league in 1955 with the movement of the old Channel Cities Oilers in Santa Barbara and continued as a member for 37 years.

For its first two decades, the California League was a Class C league, equivalent to a Rookie-level league today. It was promoted to Class A in 1963 when classes B, C, and D were abolished, and was promoted to Class A Advanced in 1990. As a Class A Advanced league, it featured prospects who had been promoted for the second or third time, as well as high first-round picks who had previously played collegiately.

Though nicknames and affiliations shifted, the California League's postwar configuration was largely stable by the late 1950s; four of the six cities in the league in 1960 would still be part of the league 50 years later. The league reached eight clubs in 1966 and would hold that for ten years, briefly dipped to six before wavering between eight and nine clubs in the early eighties, then reached ten in 1986 and held that configuration for thirty-one seasons. From 1996 to 2016, the league had a remarkably stable alignment for Class A baseball, with no teams moving or folding for twenty-one years. After the 2016 season, the Bakersfield Blaze (the last charter member from 1941 still in its original city), long dogged by inadequate facilities and unable to negotiate significant repairs, and the High Desert Mavericks, suffering from falling attendance and a lease dispute with the city of Adelanto, were folded. The High-A level replaced them by expanding the Carolina League to ten teams.

The start of the 2020 season was postponed due to the COVID-19 pandemic before ultimately being cancelled on June 30. As part of Major League Baseball's 2021 reorganization of the minor leagues, the California League was demoted to Low-A and temporarily renamed the "Low-A West" for the 2021 season. Following MLB's acquisition of the rights to the names of the historical minor leagues, the Low-A West was renamed the California League, and the Low-A classification was renamed Single-A effective with the 2022 season.

== Current teams ==
California League teams
Division	Team	MLB affiliation	City	Stadium	Capacity
North	Fresno Grizzlies	Colorado Rockies	Fresno, California	Chukchansi Park	10,650
North	San Jose Giants	San Francisco Giants	San Jose, California	Excite Ballpark	5,208
North	Stockton Ports	Athletics	Stockton, California	Banner Island Ballpark	5,200
North	Visalia Rawhide	Arizona Diamondbacks	Visalia, California	Valley Strong Ballpark	2,468
South	Inland Empire 66ers	Seattle Mariners	San Bernardino, California	San Manuel Stadium	8,000
South	Lake Elsinore Storm	San Diego Padres	Lake Elsinore, California	Lake Elsinore Diamond	5,160
South	Ontario Tower Buzzers	Los Angeles Dodgers	Ontario, California	ONT Field	6,000
South	Rancho Cucamonga Quakes	Los Angeles Angels	Rancho Cucamonga, California	Morongo Field	6,588

North Division, South Division

== League champions ==
Year by Year list of league champions:

== Complete team list (1941–1942, 1946–present) ==
- Anaheim Aces: 1941
- Bakersfield Badgers: 1941–1942
- Bakersfield Bears: 1957–1967
- Bakersfield Blaze: 1995–2016
- Bakersfield Indians: 1946–1955
- Bakersfield Boosters: 1956
- Bakersfield Dodgers: 1968–1975; 1984–1994
- Bakersfield Mariners: 1982–1983
- Bakersfield Outlaws: 1978–1979
- Central Valley Rockies: 1993–1994
- Channel Cities Oilers: 1954–1955
- Fresno Cardinals: 1941–1942
- Fresno Giants: 1958–1987
- Fresno Grizzlies: 2021–present
- Fresno Suns: 1988
- Fresno SunSox: 1957
- High Desert Mavericks: 1991–2016
- Inland Empire 66ers: 2003–present
- Lake Elsinore Storm: 1994–present
- Lancaster JetHawks: 1996–2020
- Las Vegas Wranglers: 1958
- Lodi Crushers: 1966–1969; 1984
- Lodi Dodgers: 1976–1983
- Lodi Orioles: 1974–1975
- Lodi Lions: 1973
- Lodi Orions: 1972
- Lodi Padres: 1970–1971
- Merced Bears: 1941
- Modesto A's: 1975–2004
- Modesto Colts: 1962–1964
- Modesto Nuts: 2005–2025
- Modesto Reds: 1946–1961; 1966–1974
- Mudville Nine: 2000–2001
- Ontario Tower Buzzers: 2026–present
- Palm Springs Angels: 1986–1993
- Rancho Cucamonga Quakes: 1993–present
- Redwood Pioneers: 1980–1985
- Reno Padres: 1982–1987
- Reno Silver Sox: 1955–1964; 1966–1981; 1988–1992
- Riverside Pilots: 1993–1995
- Riverside Reds: 1941
- Riverside Red Wave: 1988–1990
- Salinas Angels: 1976–1980
- Salinas Packers: 1954–1958; 1973–1975
- Salinas Indians: 1965
- Salinas Mets: 1963–1964
- Salinas Packers: 1954–1958; 1973–1975
- Salinas Spurs: 1982–1987; 1989–1992
- San Bernardino Stampede: 1996–2002
- San Bernardino Stars: 1941
- San Bernardino Spirit: 1987–1995
- San Jose Bees: 1962–1976; 1983–1987
- San Jose Expos: 1982
- San Jose Giants: 1988–present
- San Jose JoSox: 1956–1957
- San Jose Missions: 1979–1981
- San Jose Owls: 1942
- San Jose Pirates: 1958
- San Jose Red Sox: 1946–1953
- Santa Barbara Dodgers: 1947–1953; 1964–1967
- Santa Barbara Rancheros: 1962–1963
- Santa Barbara Saints: 1941–1942
- Santa Clara Padres: 1979
- Stockton Flyers: 1941
- Stockton Mariners: 1978
- Stockton Ports: 1946–1972; 1979–1999; 2002–present
- Ventura Braves: 1950–1952
- Ventura County Gulls: 1985–1986
- Ventura Oilers: 1953
- Ventura Yankees: 1947–1949
- Visalia A's: 1960–1961
- Visalia Cubs: 1946–1952; 1954–1956
- Visalia Mets: 1968–1975
- Visalia Rawhide: 2009–present
- Visalia Redlegs: 1957–1959
- Visalia Oaks: 1977–1992; 1995–2008
- Visalia Stars: 1953
- Visalia White Sox: 1962

The Los Angeles area, Riverside, San Bernardino, Palm Springs, Yuma (AZ) and Las Vegas (NV) were also major league spring training site cities, as well possessed California League teams on different occasions.

=== Cities that have had California League teams ===
- Adelanto (1991–2016)
- Anaheim (1941)
- Atwater (late 1950s–early 1960s)
- Bakersfield (1941–1942, 1946–1975, 1978–79, 1982–2016)
- Fresno (1941–1942, 1946–1988, 2021–present)
- Lake Elsinore (1994–present)
- Lancaster (1996–2020)
- Las Vegas, Nevada (1958)
- Lodi (1966–1984)
- Merced (1941)
- Modesto (1946–1964, 1966–2025)
- Palm Springs (1986–1993)
- Rancho Cucamonga (1993–present)
- Reno, Nevada (1955–1964, 1966–1992)
- Riverside (1941, 1988–1990, 1993–1995)
- Rohnert Park (1980–1985)
- Salinas (1954–1958, 1963–1965, 1973–1980, 1982–1987, 1989–1992)
- San Bernardino (1941, 1987–present)
- San Jose (1942, 1947–1958, 1962–1976, 1979–present)
- Santa Barbara (1941–1942, 1946–1953, 1962–1967)
- Santa Clara (1979)
- Stockton (1941, 1946–1972, 1978–present)
- Ventura (1947–1955, 1986)
- Visalia (1946–1962, 1968–1975, 1977–present)

Modesto has hosted a California League team longer than any other city, hosting a team in all but seven of the CL's 82 seasons.

== League timeline ==
Active team Former team

== Team list (prior incarnations) ==
=== 1906–1909 ===
- Alameda Grays/Alameda Encinals 1906–1908
- Fresno Tigers/Fresno Raisin Growers 1908–09
- Oakland Commuters 1906–1909
- Sacramento Cordovas/Sacramento Senators 1906–1908
- San Francisco Orphans 1906–1909
- San Jose Prune Pickers 1906–1909
- Santa Cruz Sand Crabs 1908–09
- Stockton Millers 1906–1909

=== 1896, 1898–1902 ===
- California of San Francisco 1896
- Fresno 1898
- Imperials of San Francisco 1896
- Los Angeles Angels 1901–02
- Oakland 1896
- Oakland Reliance/Oaks/Commuters/Clamdiggers 1898–1902
- Sacramento Gilt Edges 1899–1902
- San Francisco Metropolitans 1896, 1898
- San Francisco A's 1899
- San Jose 1896, 1898
- San Jose Brewers/San Francisco Brewers 1899–1900
- San Francisco 1902
- Santa Cruz Sand Crabs 1899
- Stockton 1896, 1898
- Stockton Wasps/San Francisco Wasps 1900–1901
- Watsonville Hayseeds 1899

=== 1879–1893 ===
- Los Angeles Seraphs/Los Angeles Angels 1892–1893
- Oakland Colonels 1889–1893
- Oakland Greenhood & Morans 1886–1888
- Oakland Pioneers 1879
- Sacramento Altas 1886–1887, 1889
- Sacramento Senators 1890–1891
- San Francisco 1880, 1884–1885
- San Francisco Athletics 1879–1881
- San Francisco Bay City 1880
- San Francisco Californias 1879–1880, 1882–1883
- San Francisco Friscos/Metropolitans 1891–1893
- San Francisco Haverlys 1883–1890
- San Francisco Knickerbockers 1881
- San Francisco Nationals 1882
- San Francisco Mutuals 1879
- San Francisco Niantic 1883
- San Francisco Occidental 1884–1885
- San Francisco Pioneers 1886–1888
- San Francisco Reddingtons 1883
- San Francisco Reno 1881–82
- San Francisco Star 1884–1886
- San Jose Dukes 1891–1892
- Stockton 1888–1890
- Stockton River Pirates/Sacramento Senators 1893

== California League Hall of Fame ==
The California League inducted its first class of 15 inductees into its Hall of Fame in 2016.

== Awards ==
=== Most Valuable Player ===
The California League Most Valuable Player Award was established in 1941.

=== Pitcher of the Year ===
For award winners, see footnote

=== Rookie of the Year ===
For award winners, see footnote

=== Manager of the Year ===
For award winners, see footnote

=== Doug Harvey Award ===
The Doug Harvey Award—established in 2010—is for the umpire of the year.

== See also ==
- Baseball awards § California League
