= Nashville Vols all-time roster =

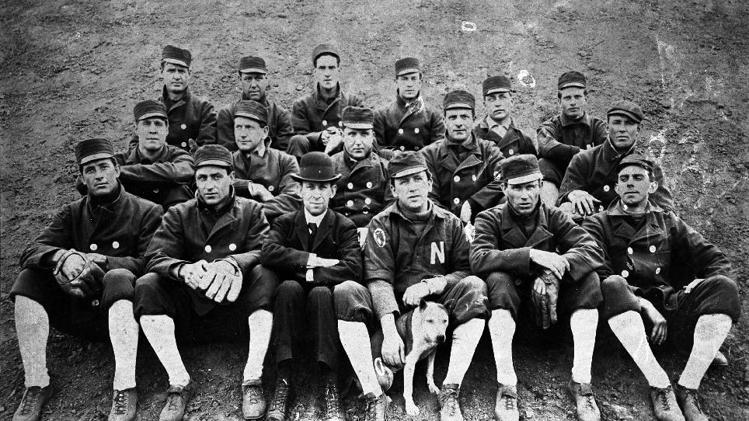
The 1901 Nashville Baseball Club won the first Southern Association pennant.

The Nashville Vols were a Minor League Baseball team that played in Nashville, Tennessee, from 1901 to 1963. They were established as charter members of the Southern Association in 1901. Known as the Nashville Baseball Club during their first seven seasons, they became the Nashville Volunteers (regularly shortened to Vols) in 1908. Nashville remained in the Southern Association until the circuit disbanded after the 1961 season. The team sat out the 1962 campaign but returned for a final season in the South Atlantic League in 1963 before ceasing operations altogether. Over 62 seasons, 1,222 players competed in at least one game for the Vols. Of those, 567 also played in at least one game for a Major League Baseball team. Seventeen player-managers served in the role of manager concurrent with their on-field playing.

The Southern Association, of which the Volunteers were members for the entirety of its 61-season run, operated at the Class B (1901), Class A (1902–1935), Class A1 (1936–1945), and Double-A (1946–1961) levels of the minors. The South Atlantic League was at the Double-A level during Nashville's only year of membership. In 35 seasons, the Vols were not affiliated with any Major League Baseball team. Across 27 seasons, they served as a farm club for six major league franchises: the New York Giants (1934–1935, 1952–1954), Cincinnati Reds (1936–1937, 1955–1960), Brooklyn Dodgers (1938–1940), Chicago Cubs (1943–1951), Minnesota Twins (1961), and Los Angeles Angels (1963). The Vols typically owned the majority of their players, and these major league clubs furnished Nashville with additional players to round out the roster.

Twenty-four of the team's players distinguished themselves after their playing time in Nashville by winning a Major League Baseball award, being named to a major league All-Star team, or being elected to the National Baseball Hall of Fame. Jake Daubert and Bucky Walters each won Most Valuable Player Awards. Dusty Rhodes won the Babe Ruth Award. Johnny Edwards won a Gold Glove Award. Twenty-one alumni were selected to play in the Major League Baseball All-Star Game. Kiki Cuyler and Waite Hoyt were elected to the National Baseball Hall of Fame.

== Players ==
General key
Position(s)	The player's primary fielding position(s) (Note: Players are listed at a position if they appeared in 30% of their games or more at that position during their Nashville career, as defined by Baseball-Reference. Players failing to meet this threshold are listed at their most-played position.)
MLB	Indicates if a player appeared in at least one game for a major league team
†	Player was an MLB award winner or All-Star after playing for Nashville
*	Indicates a player-manager

Positions key
P	Pitcher	3B	Third baseman
C	Catcher	SS	Shortstop
1B	First baseman	OF	Outfielder
2B	Second baseman	—	No record available

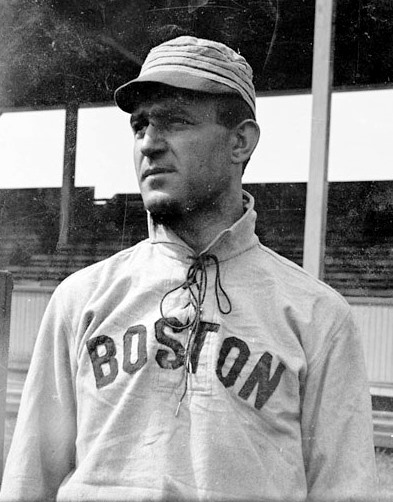
Ed Abbaticchio, player (1901–1902)

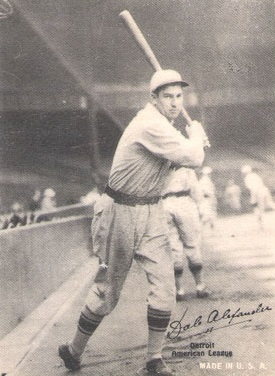
Dale Alexander, first baseman (1937)

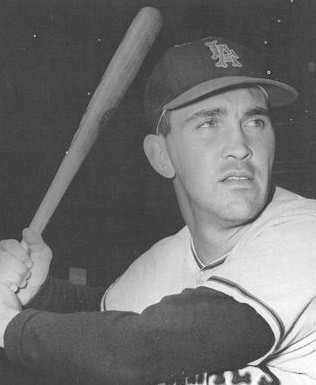
Earl Averill Jr., player (1955)

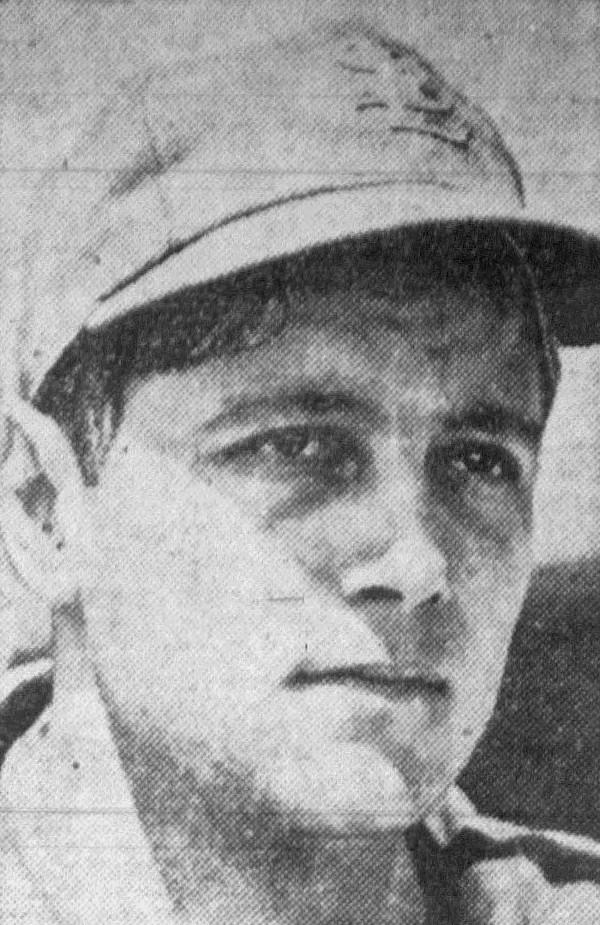
Johnny Beazley, pitcher (1949)

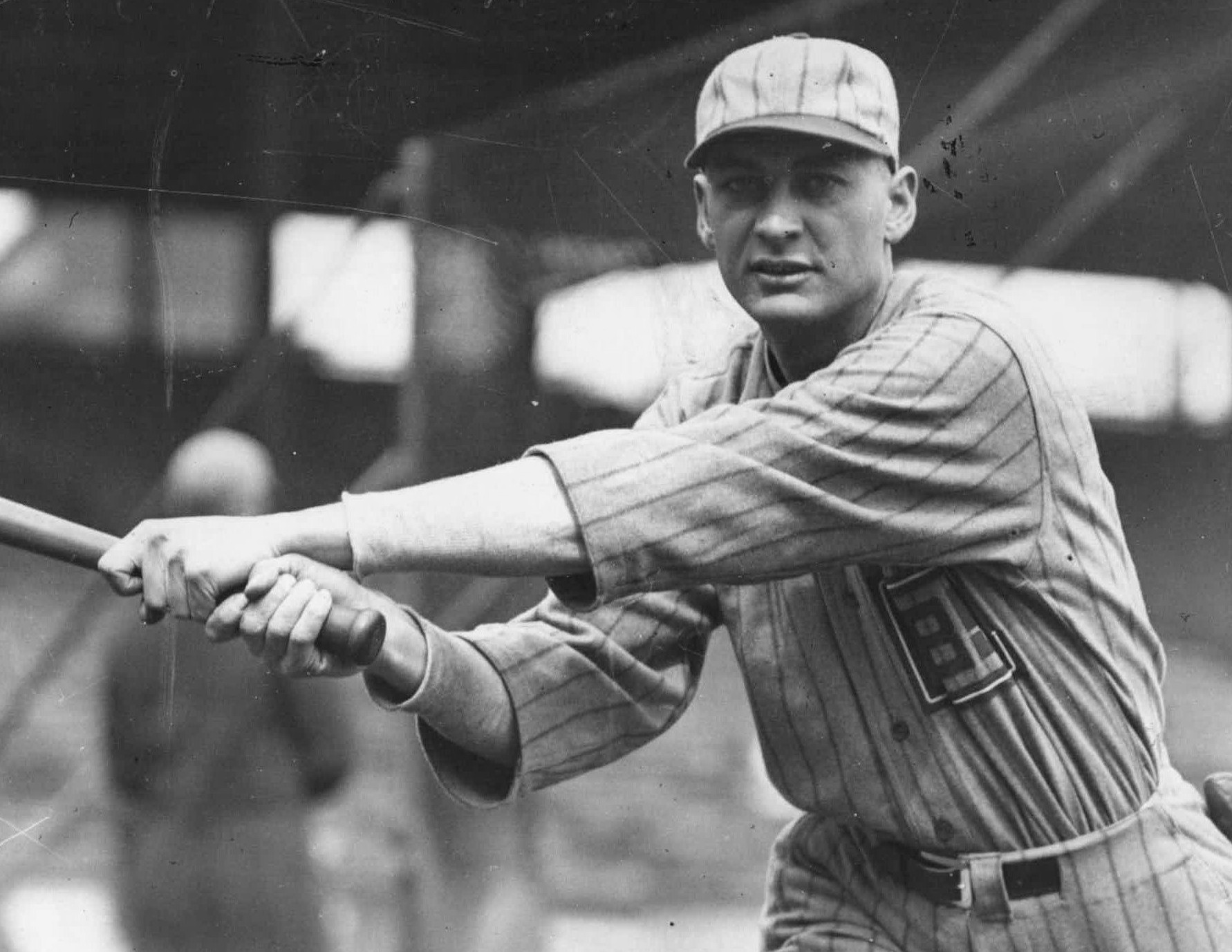
Turner Barber, outfielder (1928)

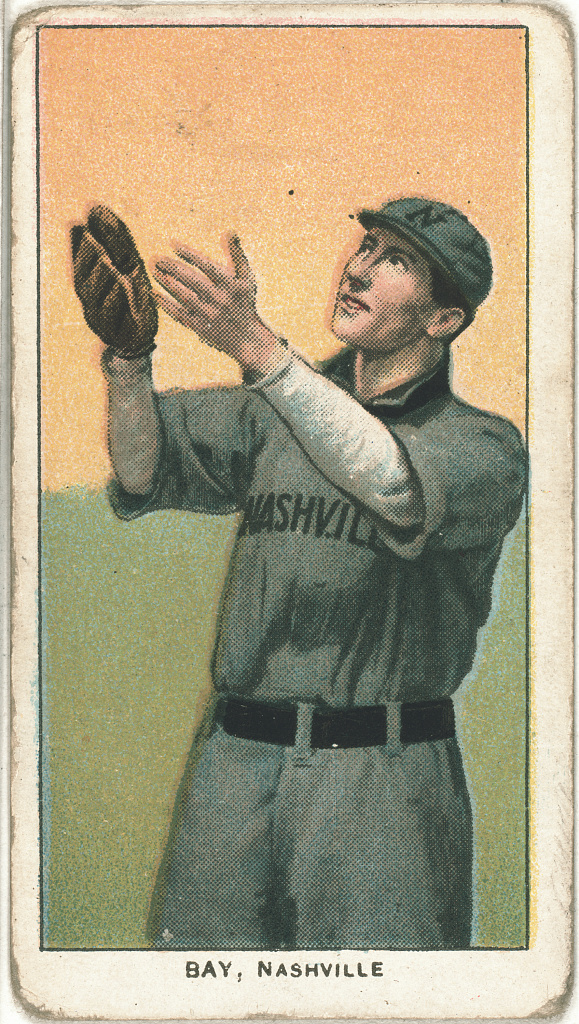
Harry Bay, outfielder (1908–1911)

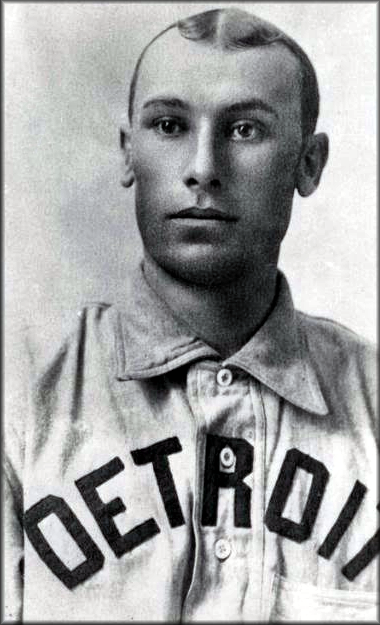
Erve Beck, first baseman (1906)

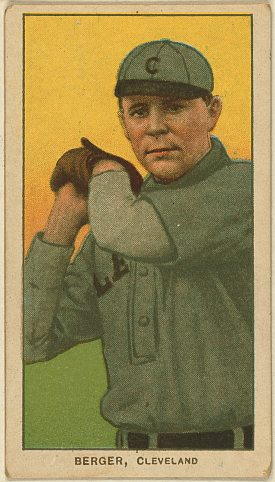
Heinie Berger, pitcher (1914–1915)

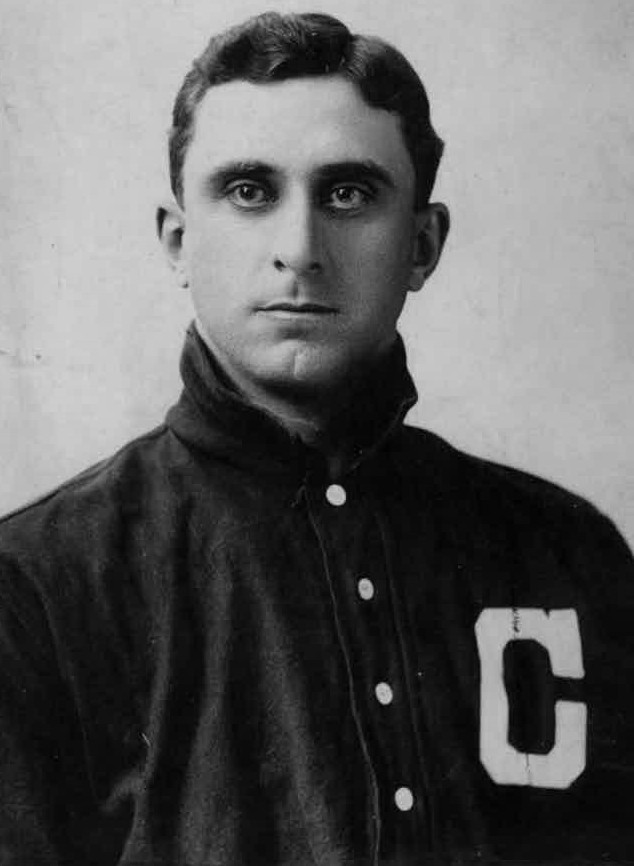
Bill Bernhard, manager/pitcher (1908–1911)

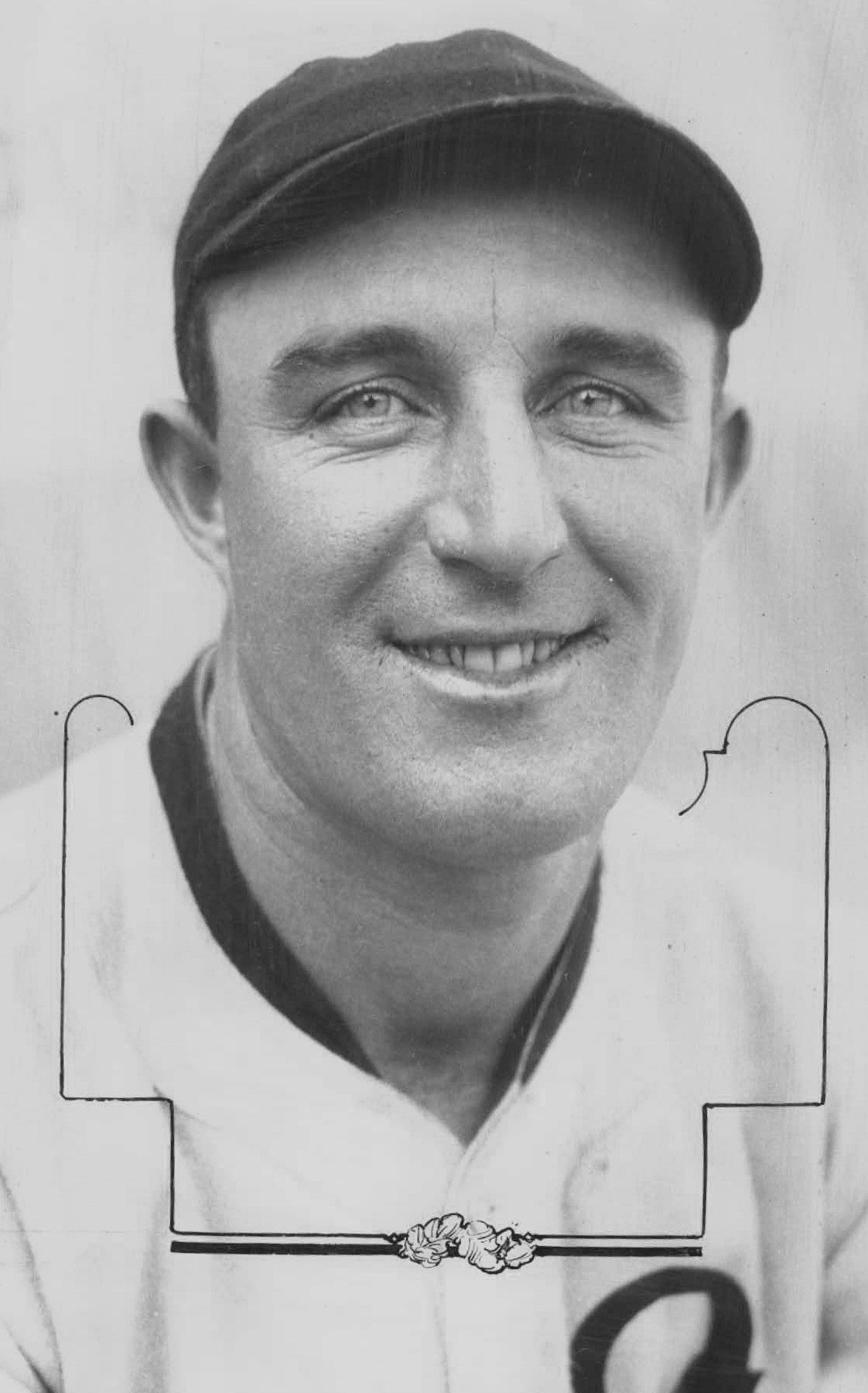
George Boehler, pitcher (1930)

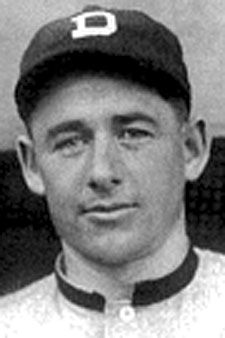
Bernie Boland, pitcher (1913–1914)

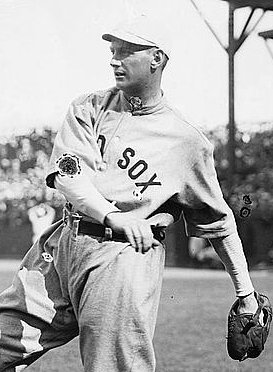
Hugh Bradley, first baseman (1921)

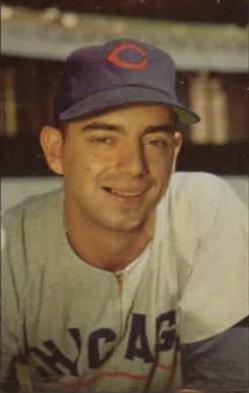
Tommy Brown, third baseman (1955–1958)

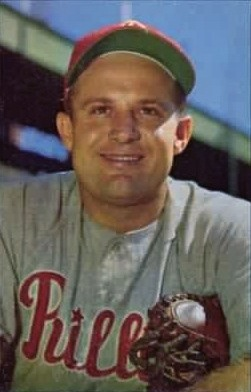
Smoky Burgess, player (1948)

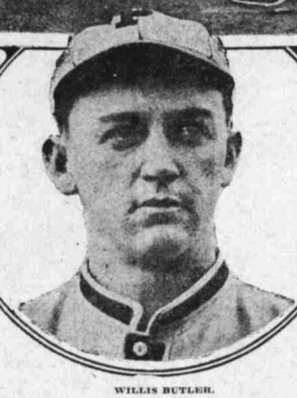
Kid Butler, shortstop/second baseman (1908–1909)

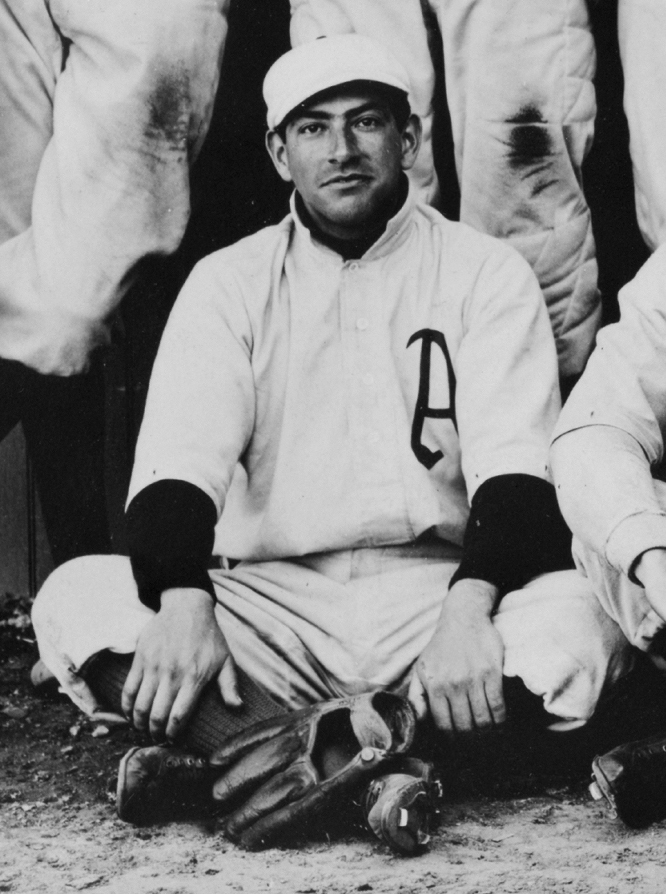
Lou Castro, shortstop (1906)

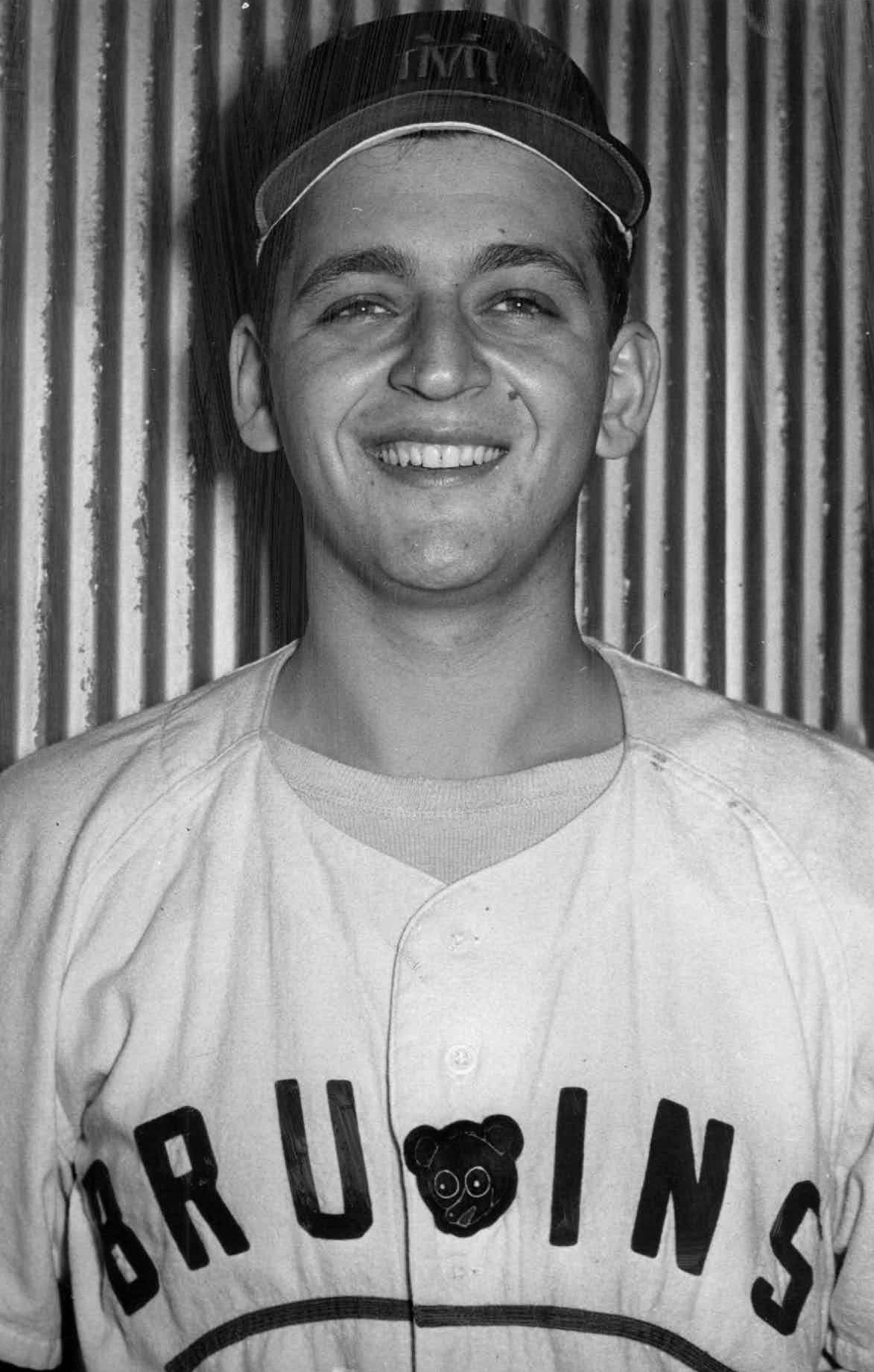
Hy Cohen, pitcher (1958)

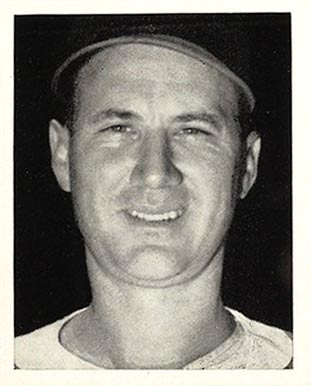
Bill Crouch, pitcher (1937–1938)

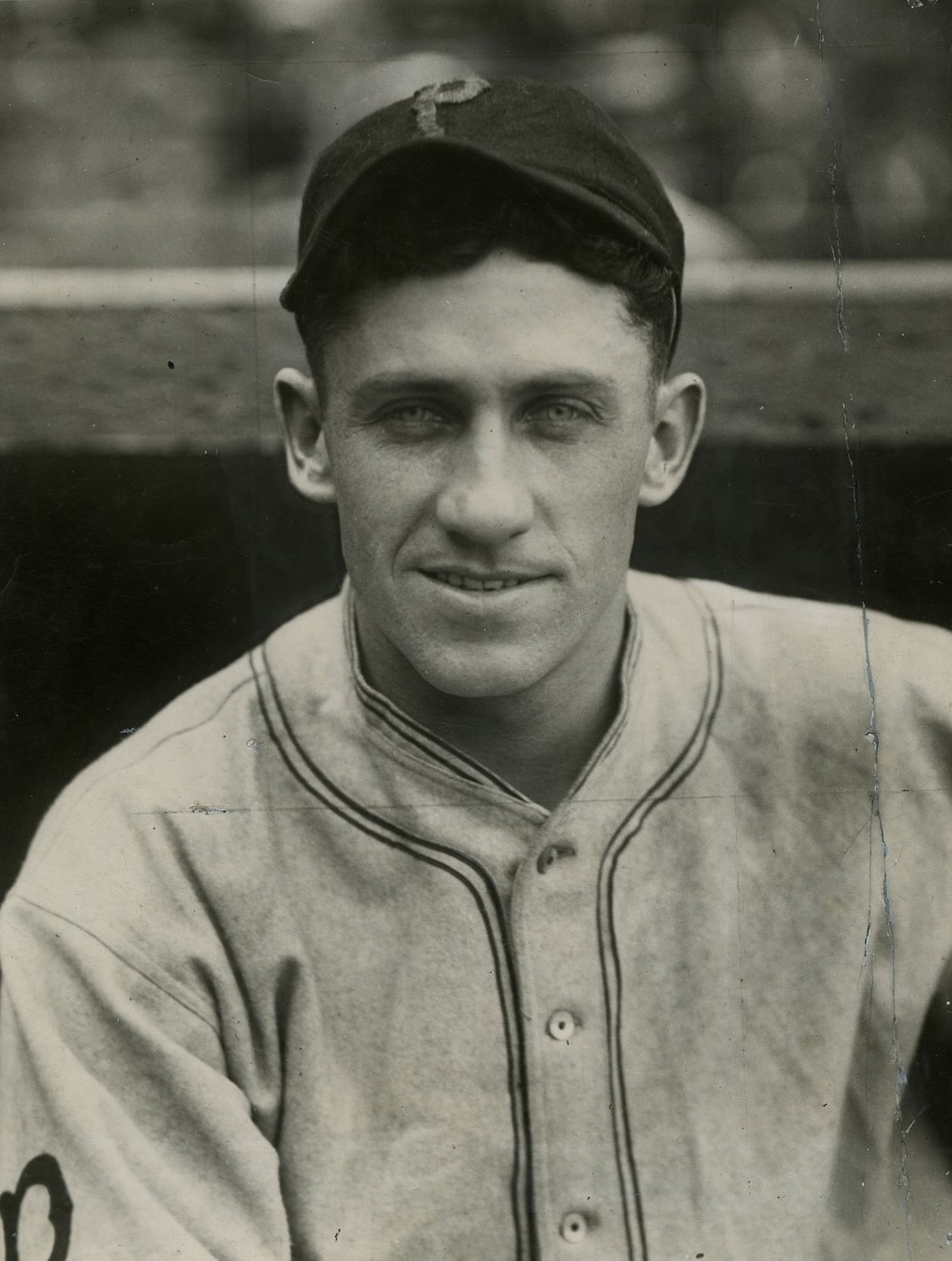
Kiki Cuyler, outfielder (1923)

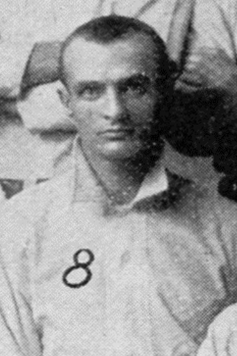
Bill Dammann, pitcher (1902, 1906)

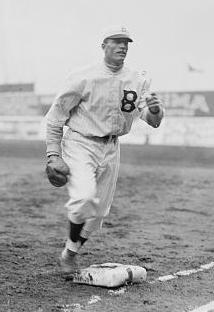
Jake Daubert, first baseman (1908)

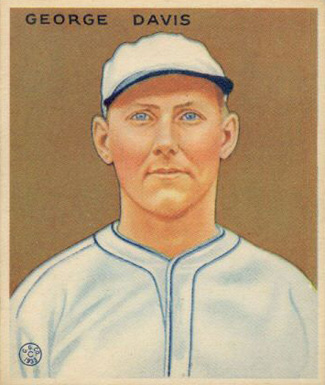
Kiddo Davis, player (1927)

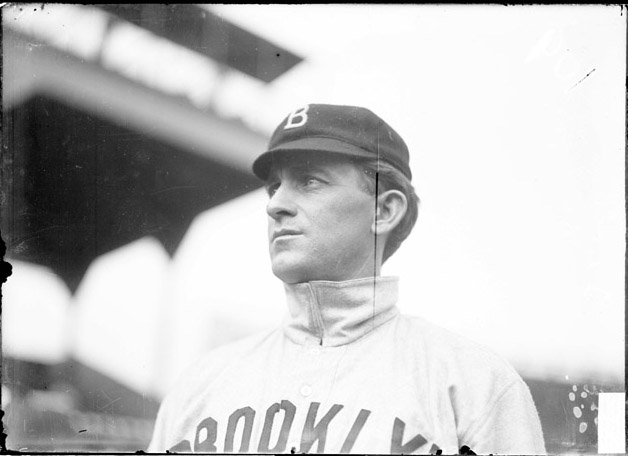
John Dobbs, player-manager (1907)

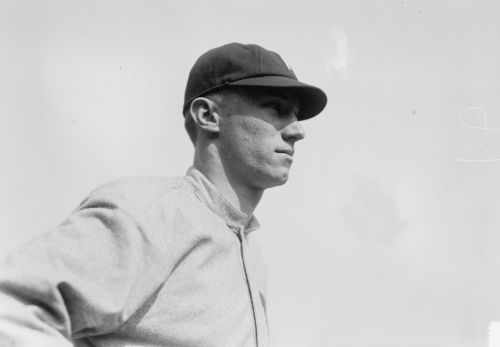
John Dodge, third baseman (1914–1915)

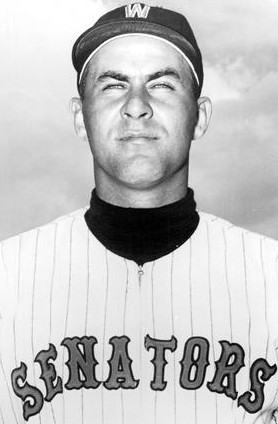
Dutch Dotterer, catcher (1955, 1957)

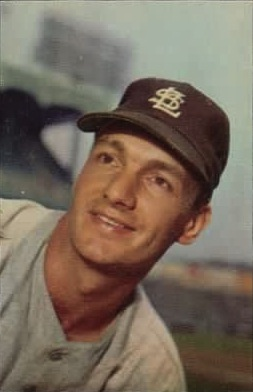
Jim Dyck, player (1956)

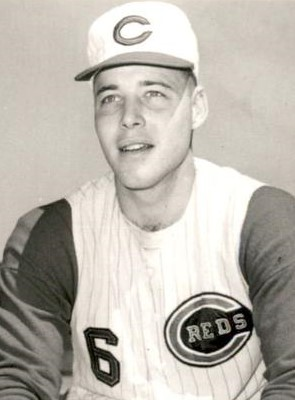
Johnny Edwards, catcher (1960)

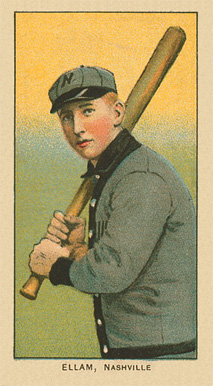
Roy Ellam, manager/shortstop (1916–1920)

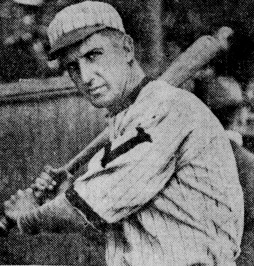
Bob Fisher, second baseman (1924)

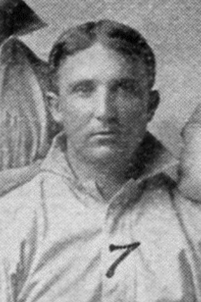
Newt Fisher, player-manager (1901–1905)

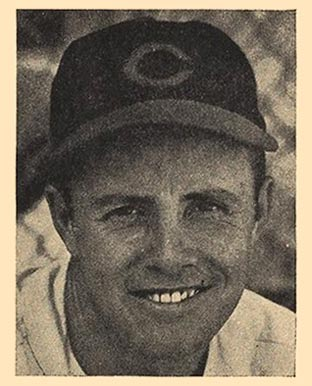
Lonny Frey, shortstop (1933)

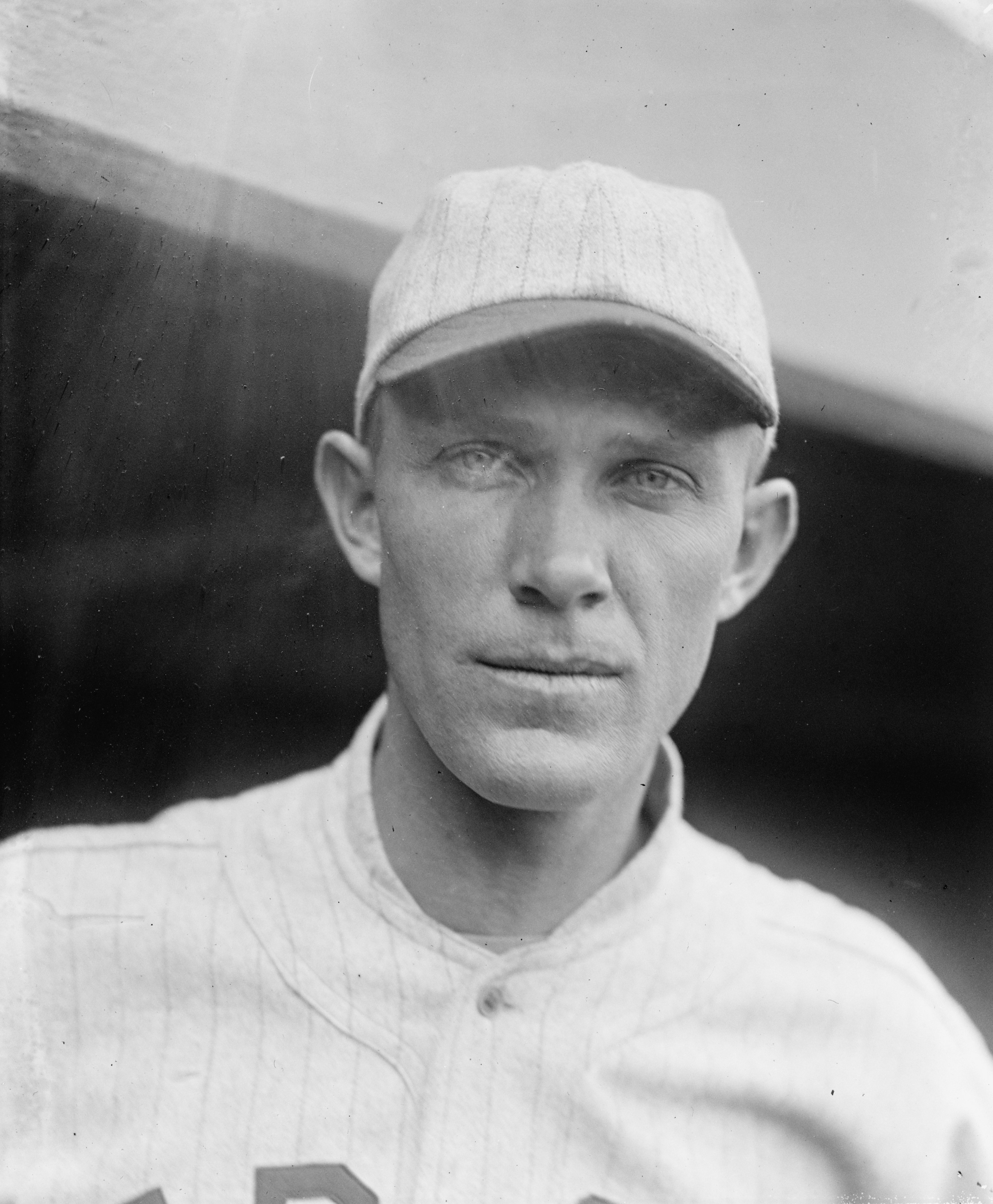
Oscar Fuhr, pitcher (1927–1928)

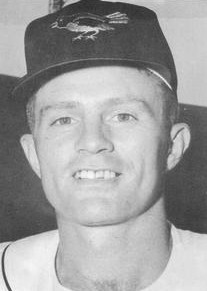
Billy Gardner, shortstop (1953)

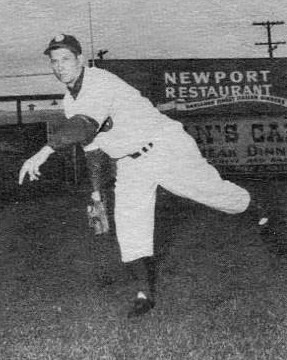
Charlie Gassaway, pitcher (1937, 1939–1943)

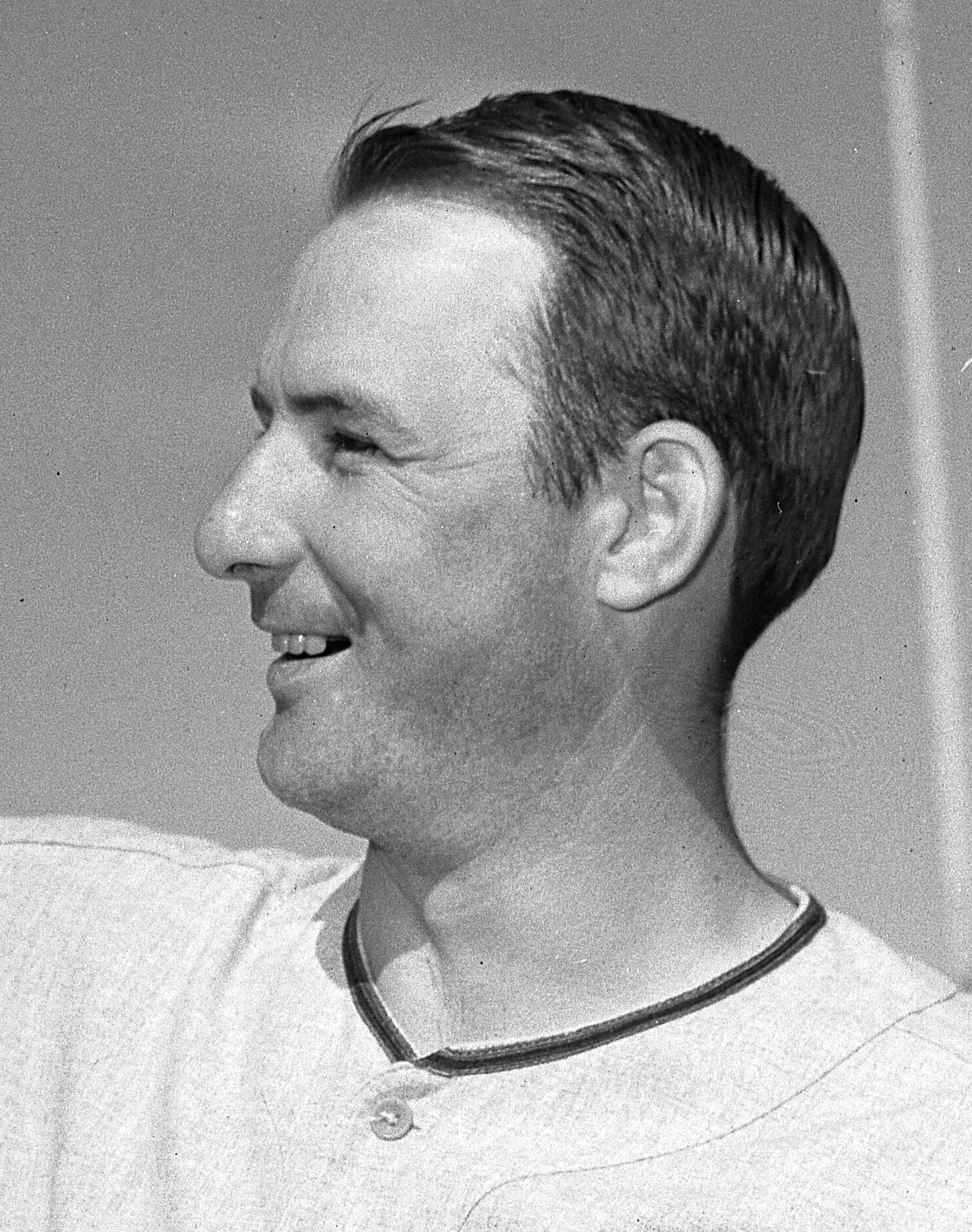
Aubrey Gatewood, pitcher (1963)

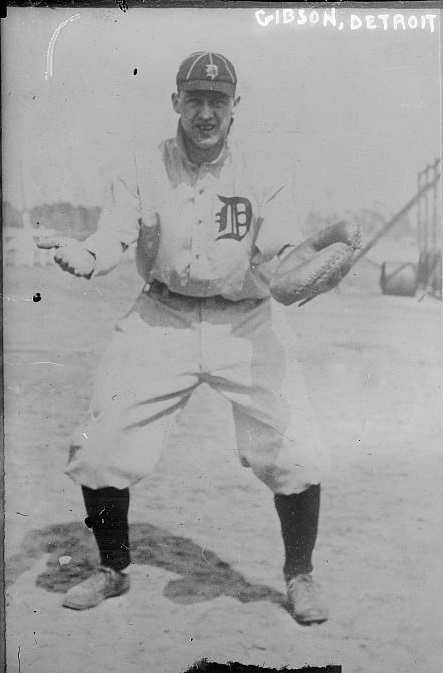
Frank Gibson, catcher (1913–1914)

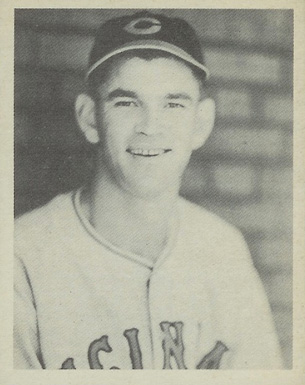
Lee Grissom, pitcher (1936)

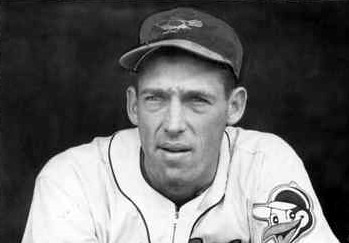
Jack Harshman, first baseman/pitcher (1951, 1953)

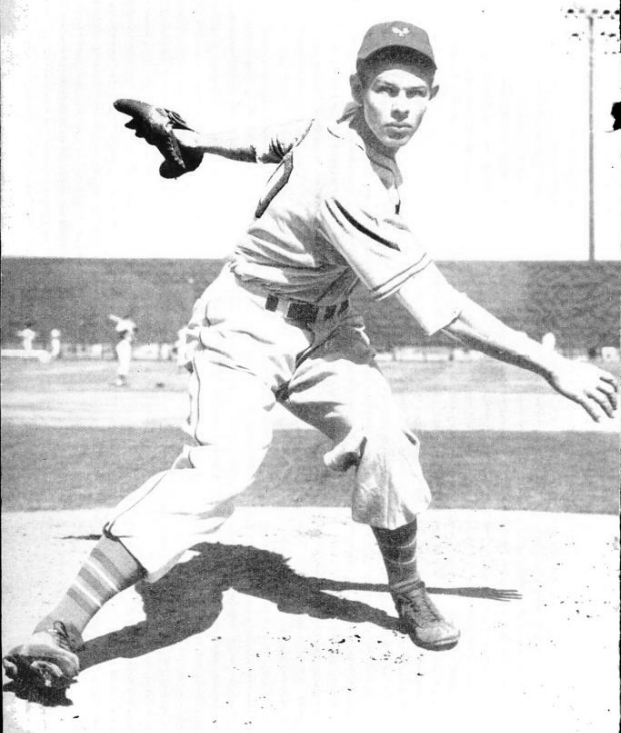
Clint Hartung, player (1955)

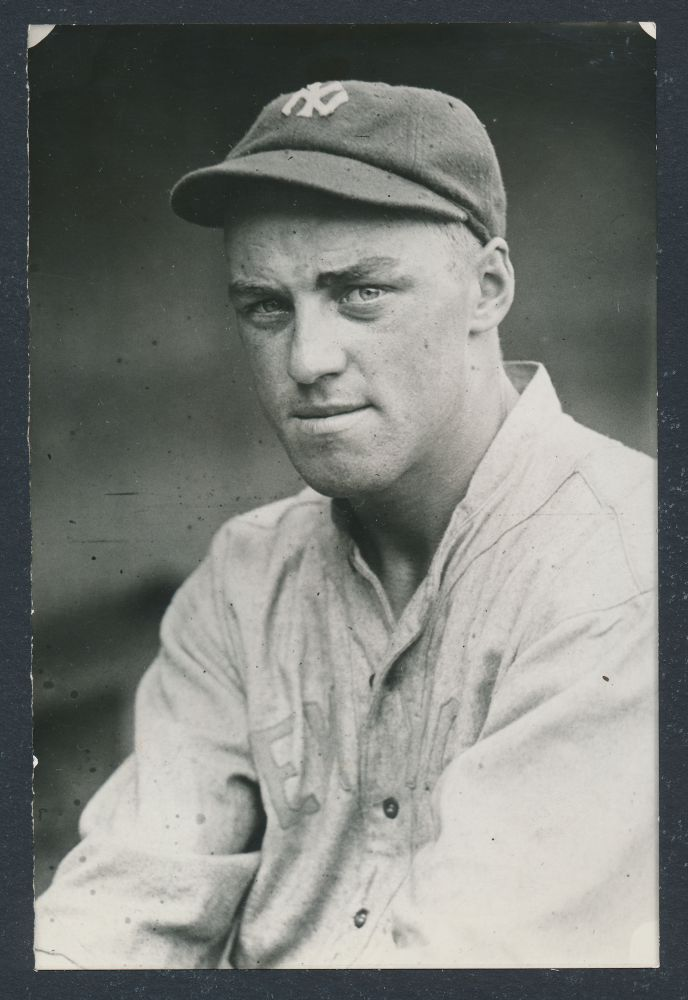
Chicken Hawks, first baseman (1923–1924)

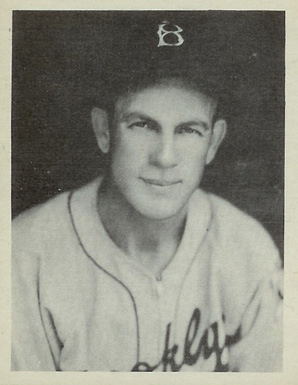
Ray Hayworth, catcher (1927)

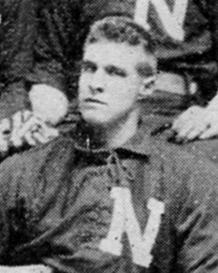
Art Herman, pitcher (1903–1906)

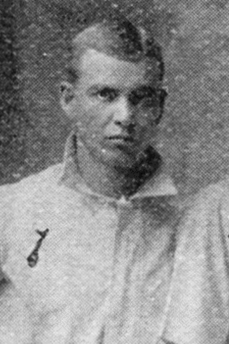
Hugh Hill, pitcher (1901–1903)

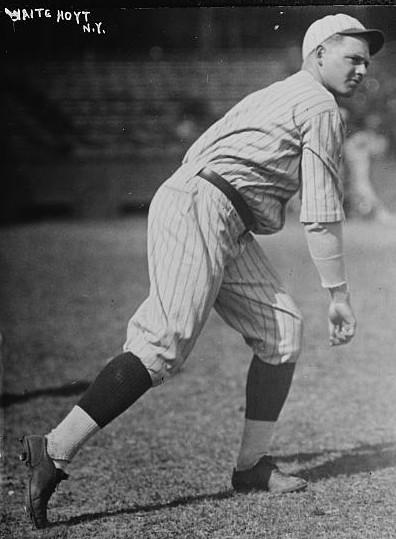
Waite Hoyt, pitcher (1918)

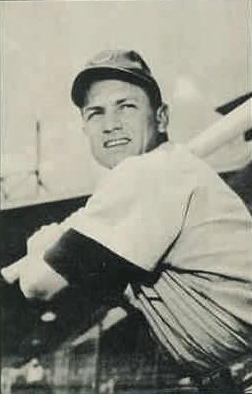
Hal Jeffcoat, outfielder (1946–1947)

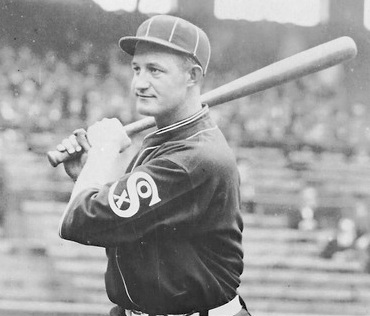
Smead Jolley, outfielder (1937)

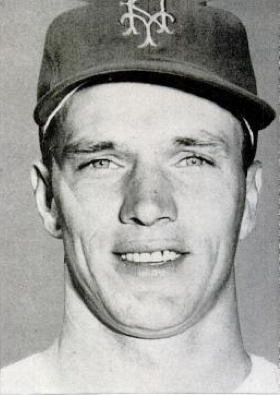
Rod Kanehl, second baseman/outfielder (1960–1961)

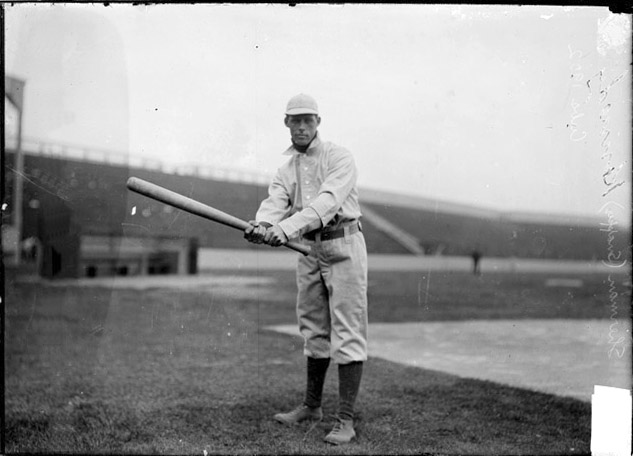
Snapper Kennedy, player (1901–1904)

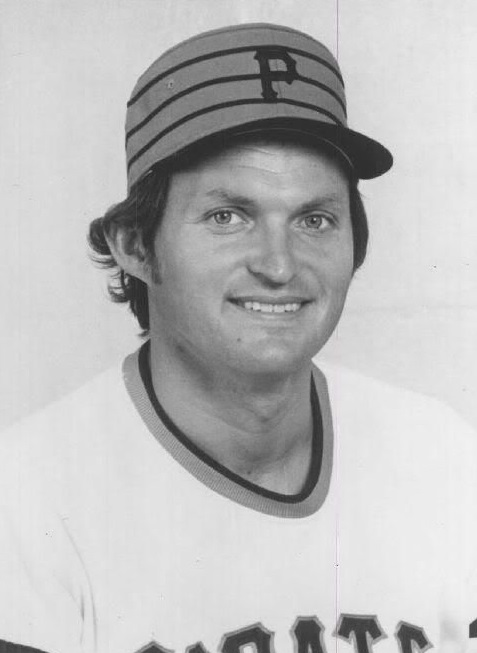
Ed Kirkpatrick, outfielder/catcher (1963)

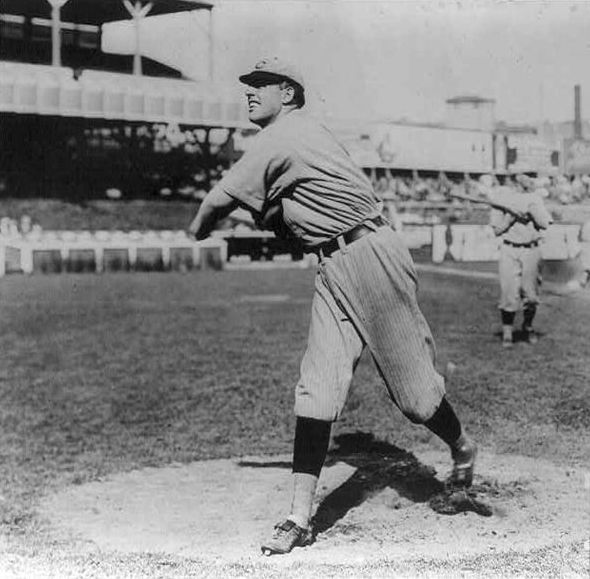
Rube Kroh, pitcher (1914–1916)

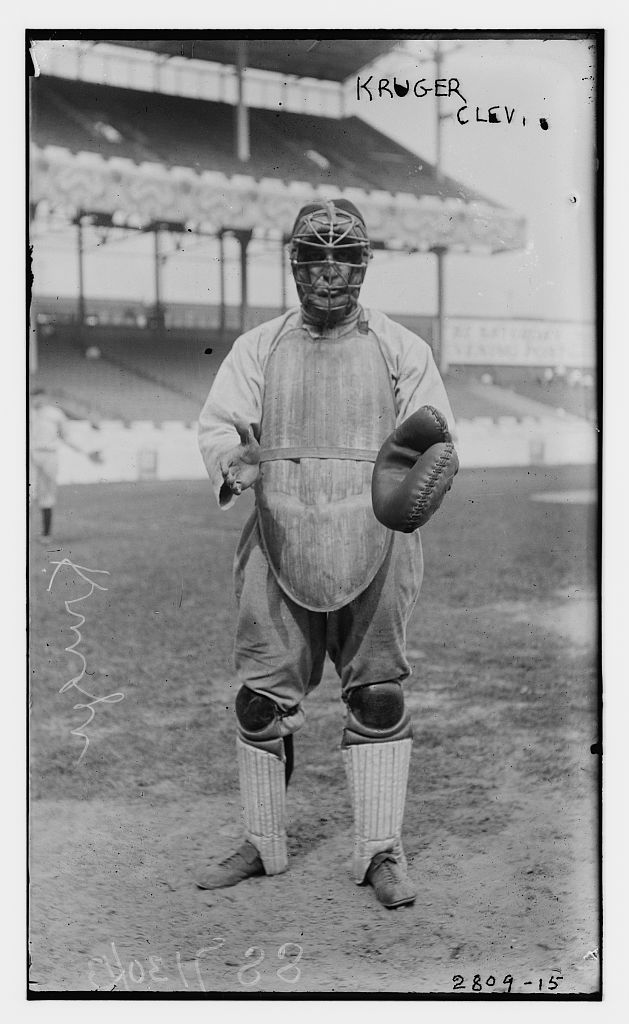
Ernie Krueger, catcher (1929–1930)

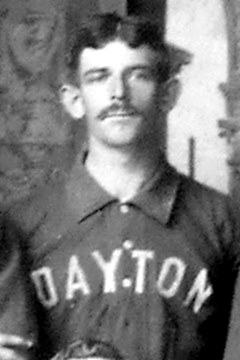
Tacks Latimer, player (1907)

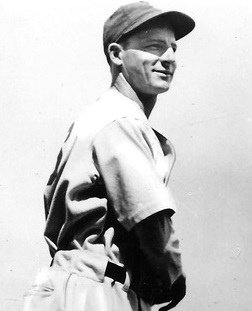
Roxie Lawson, pitcher (1941)

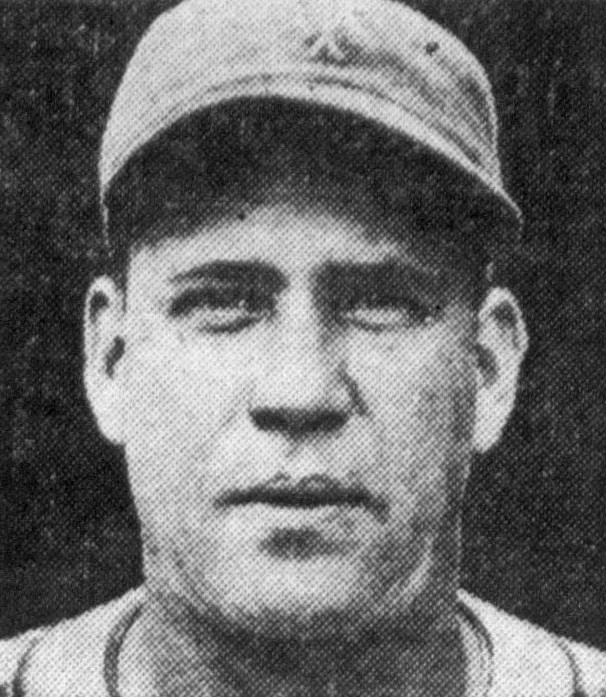
Hank Leiber, outfielder (1934)

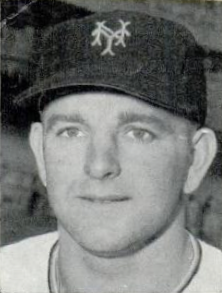
Bob Lennon, outfielder (1952–1954)

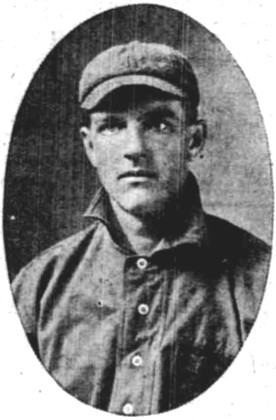
Pete Lister, player (1907)

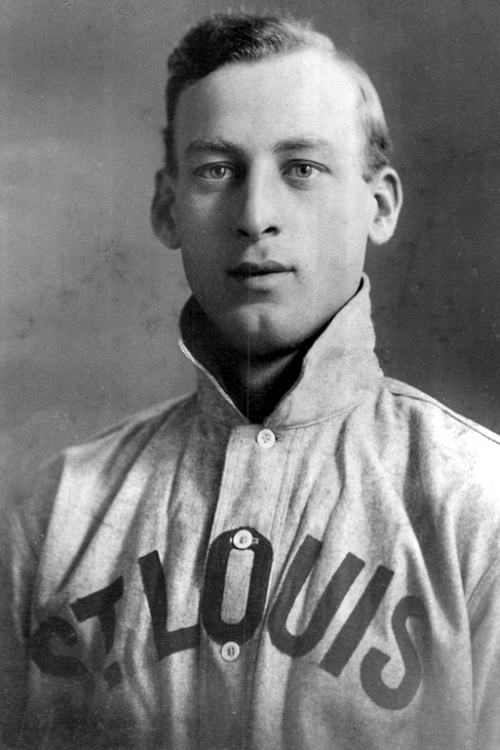
Bill Ludwig, player (1913)

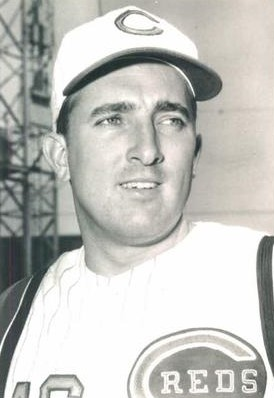
Jim Maloney, pitcher (1960)

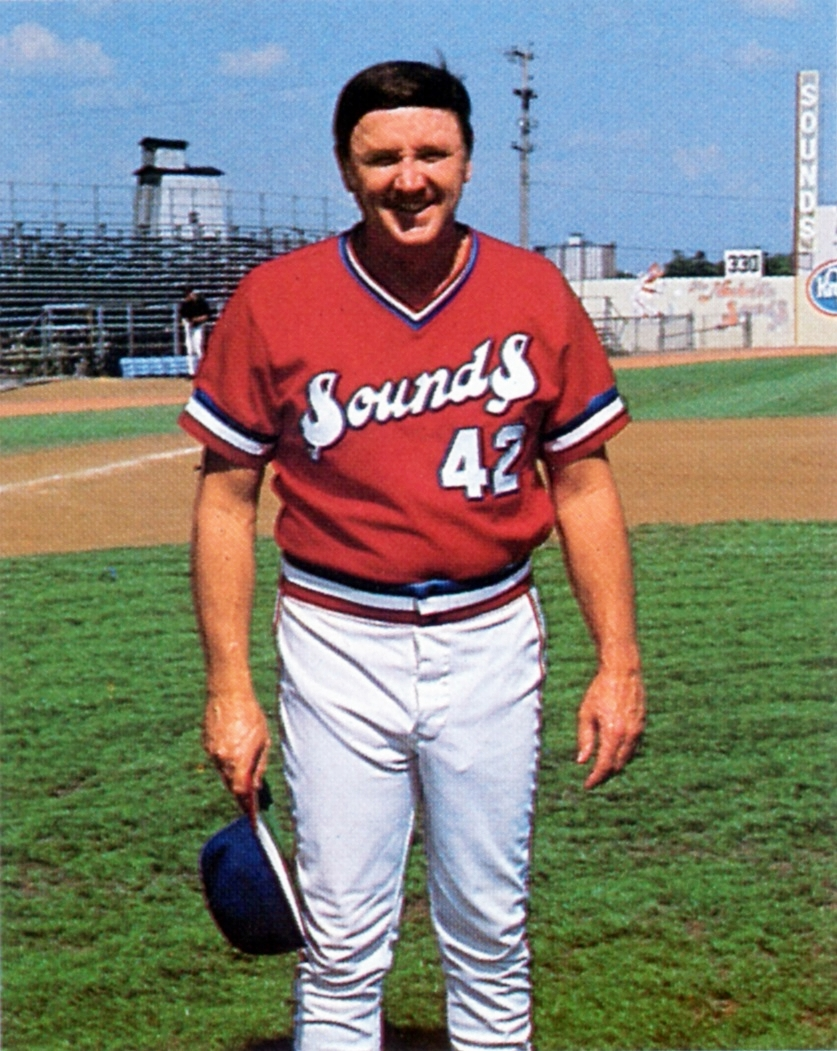
Jim Marshall, player (1952)

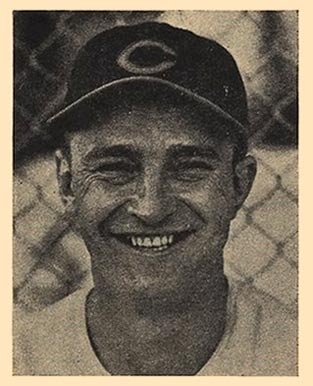
Frank McCormick, first baseman (1935)

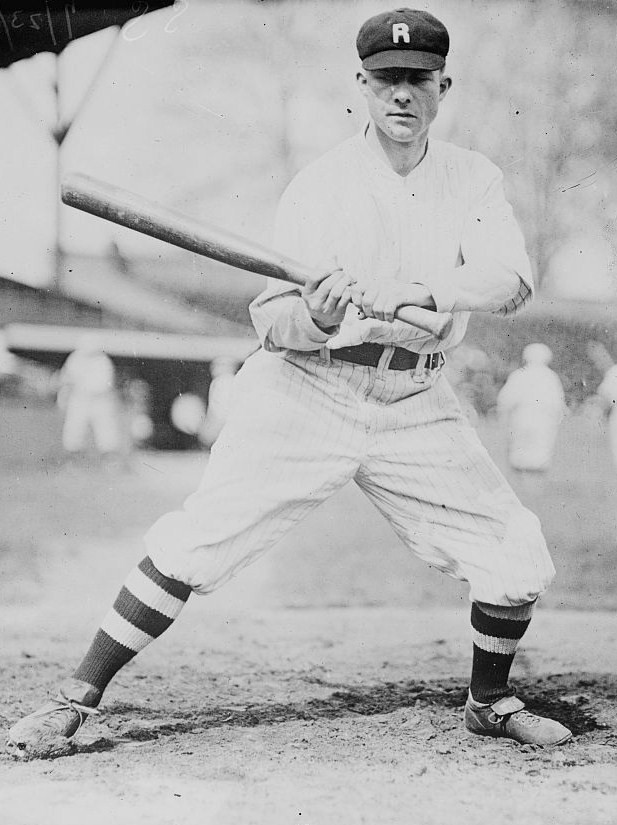
Tommy McMillan, shortstop (1923)

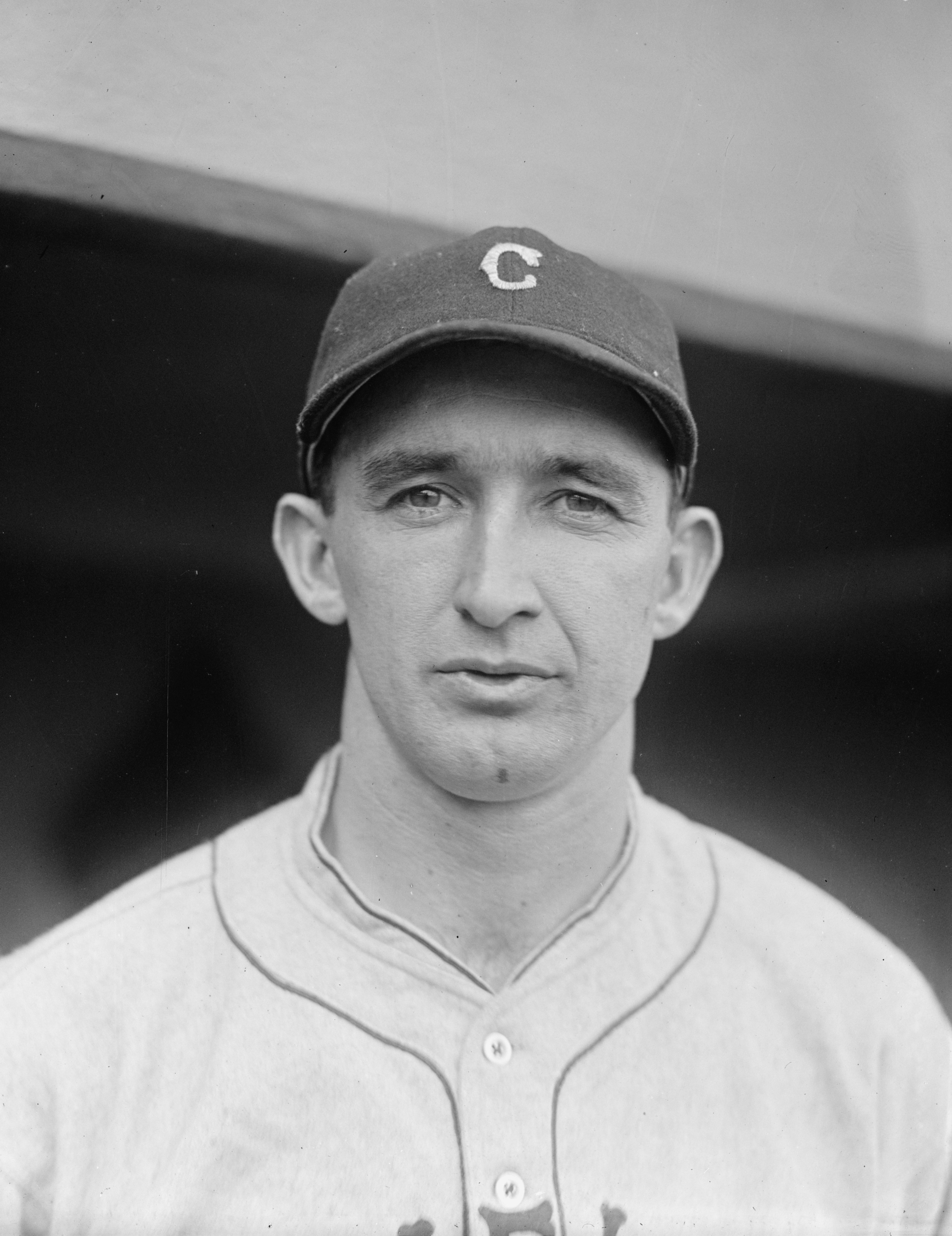
Pat McNulty, outfielder (1929)

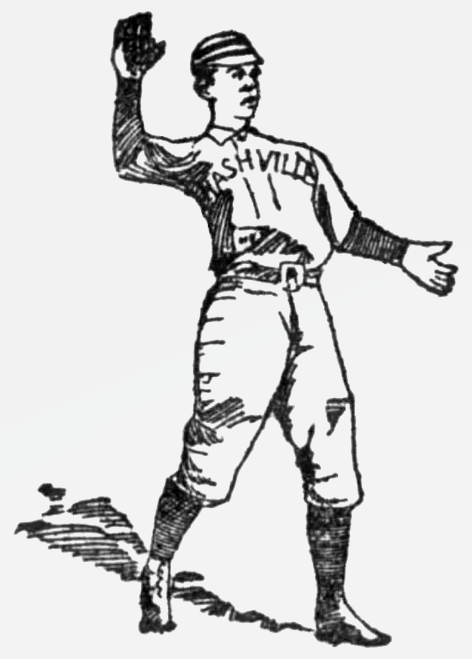
Dusty Miller, outfielder (1906)

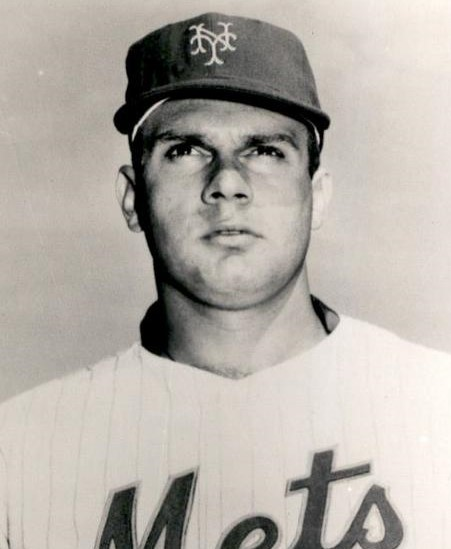
Bob Moorhead, pitcher (1959)

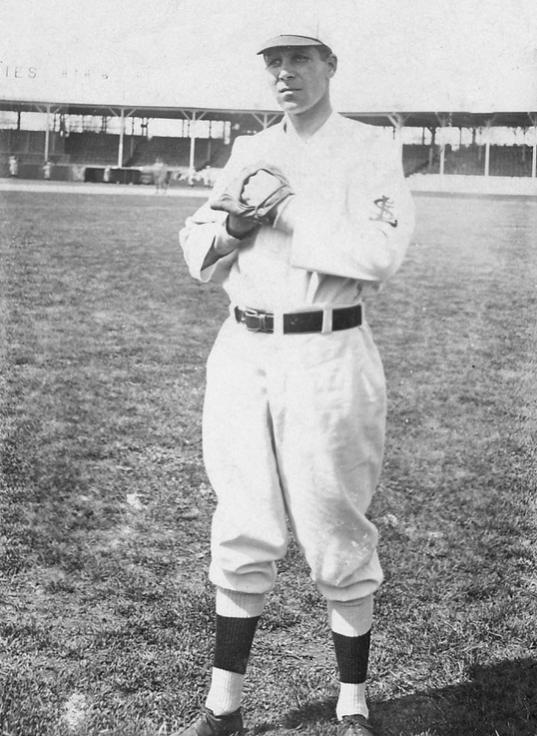
Forrest More, pitcher (1913–1914)

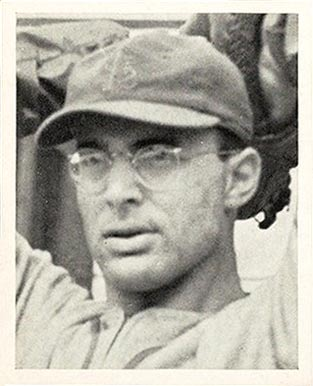
Sam Nahem, pitcher (1939)

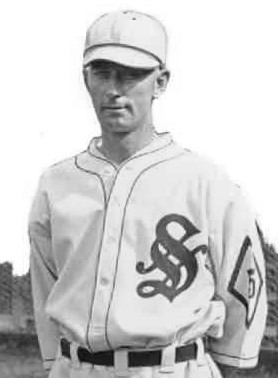
Ovid Nicholson, player (1913)

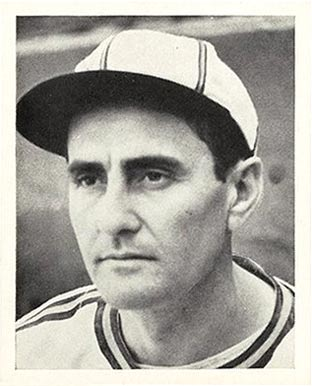
Johnny Niggeling, pitcher (1933)

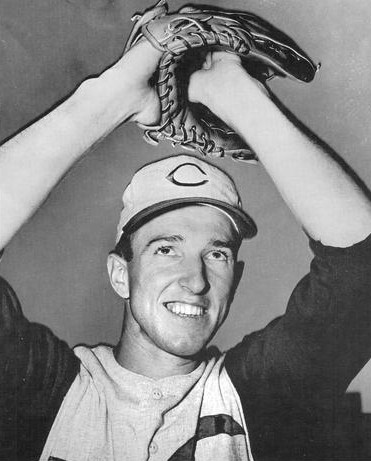
Claude Osteen, player (1957)

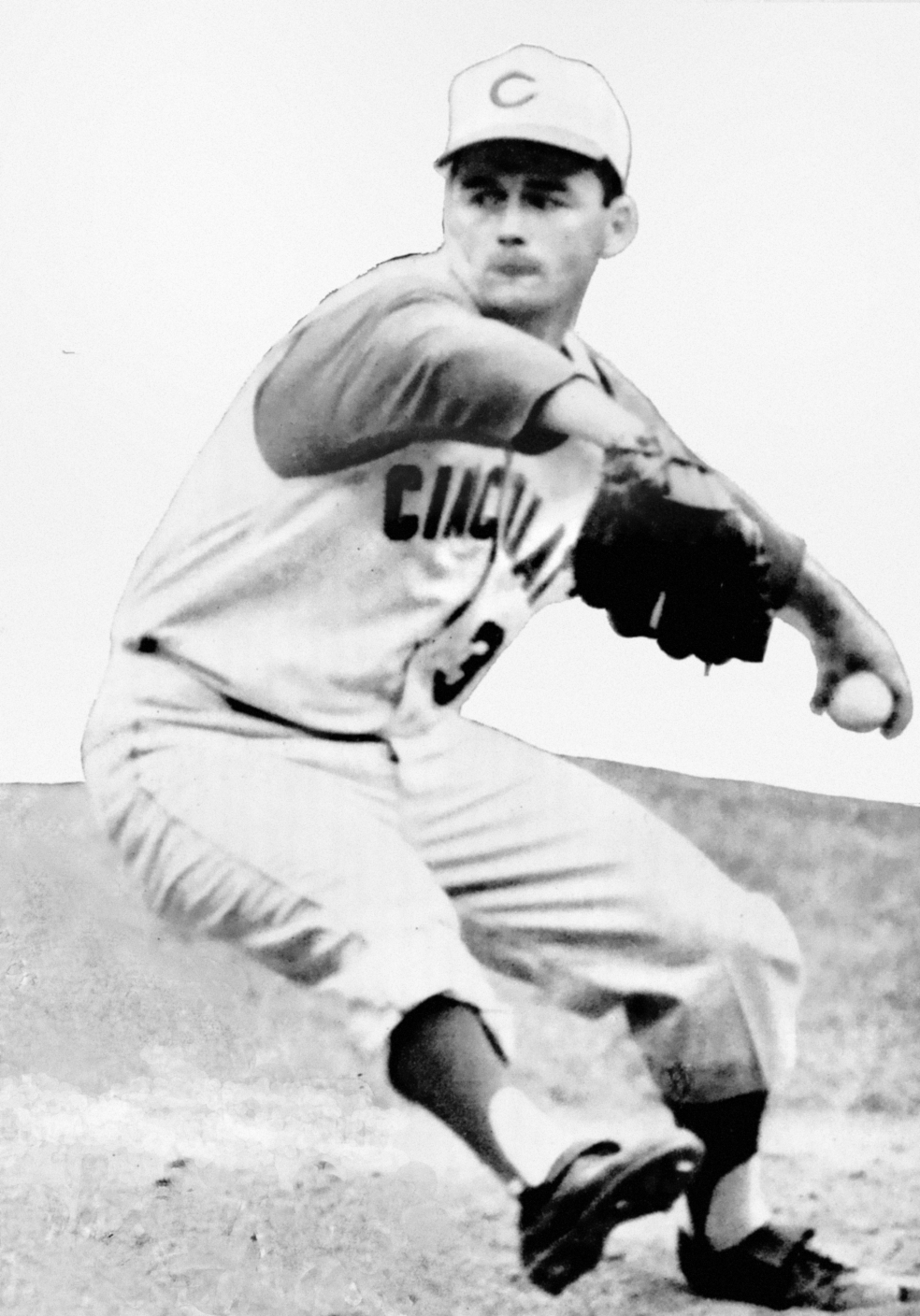
Jim O'Toole, pitcher (1958)

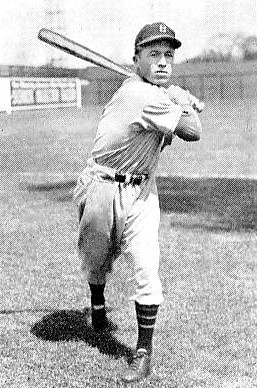
Jimmy Outlaw, third baseman (1936)

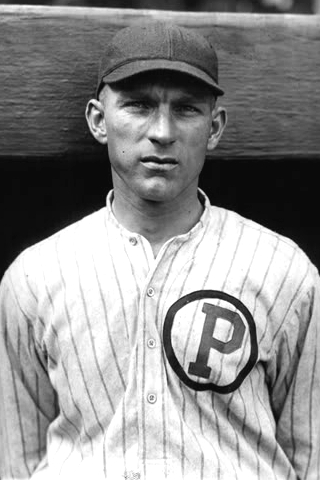
Frank Parkinson, second baseman (1925)

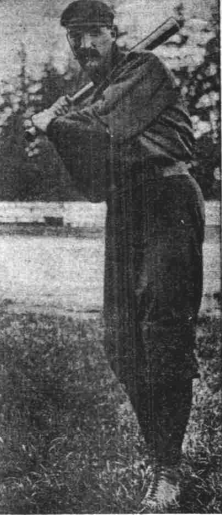
Tom Parrott, player (1901, 1903–1904)

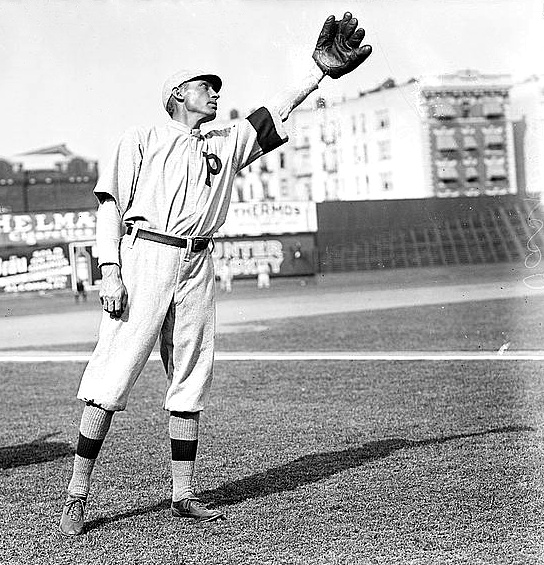
Dode Paskert, outfielder (1924)

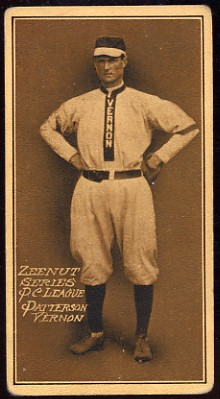
Ham Patterson, player (1910)

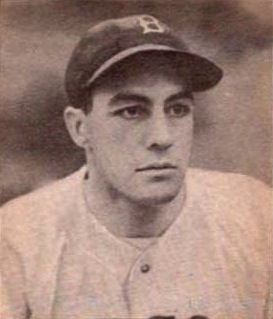
Johnny Peacock, catcher (1936)

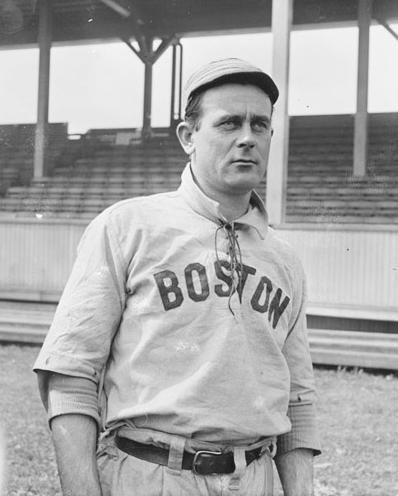
Wiley Piatt, pitcher (1904)

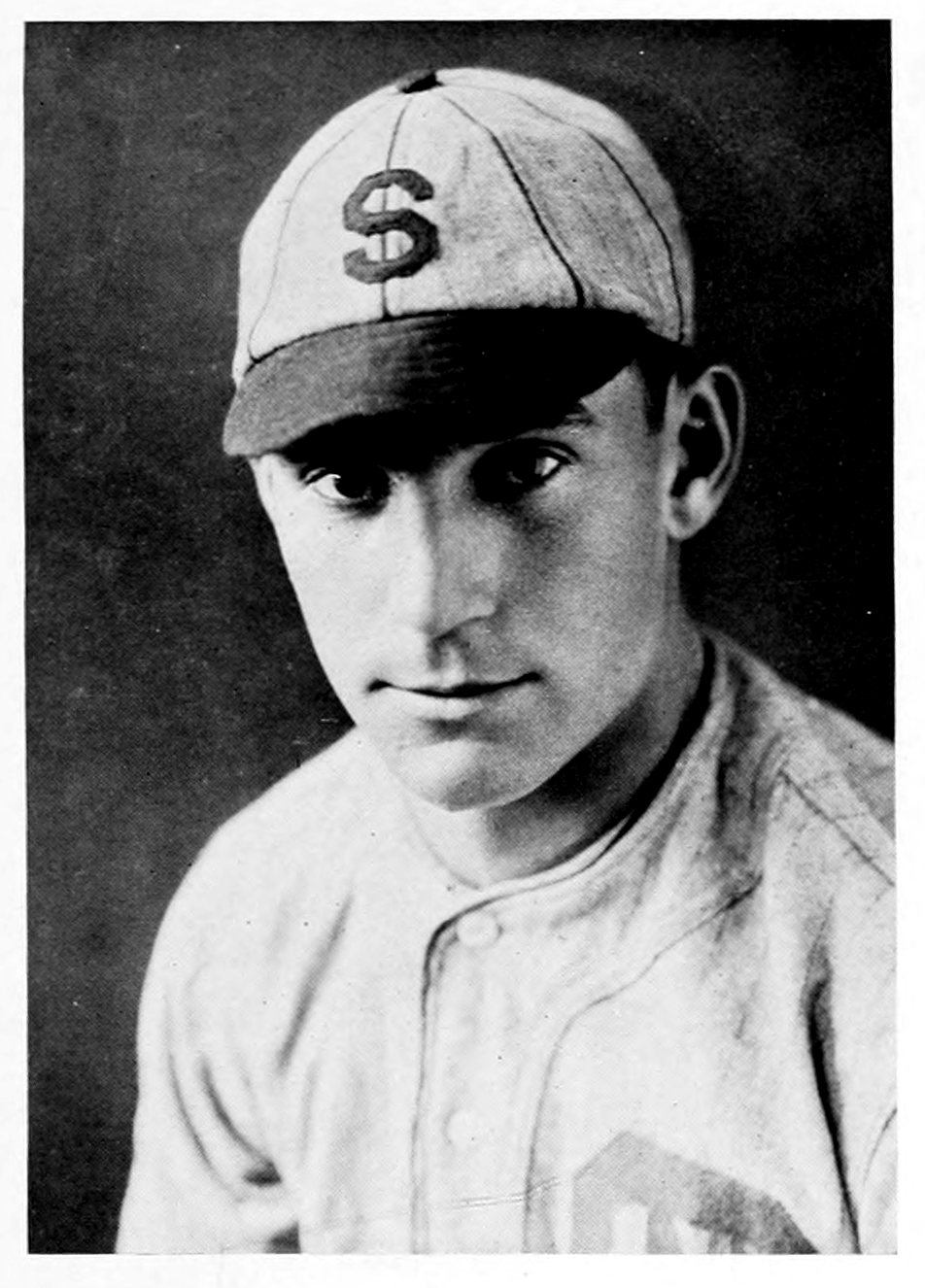
Buck Redfern, shortstop (1926–1927)

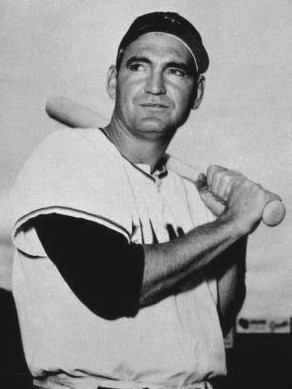
Dusty Rhodes, player (1952)

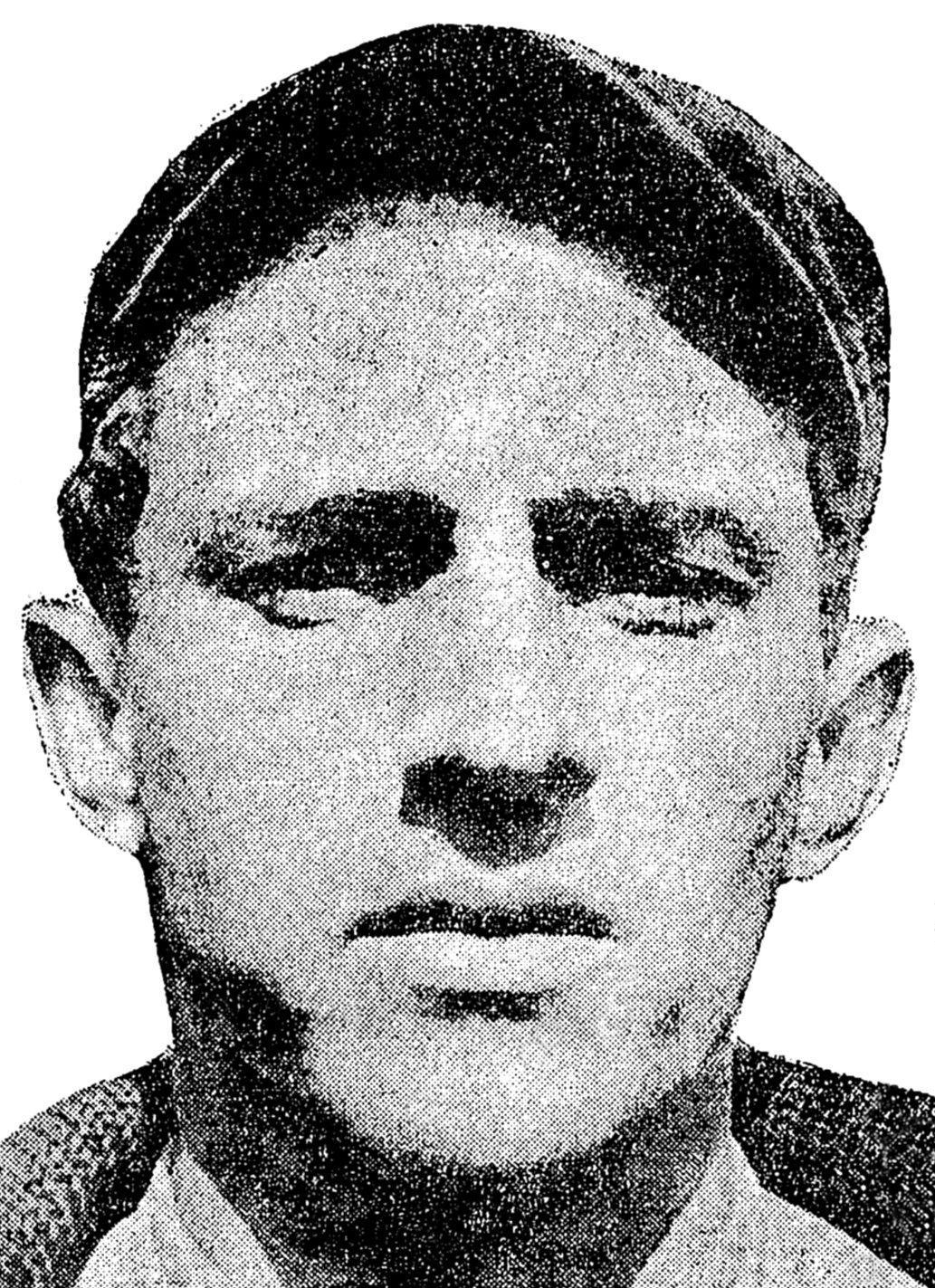
Tom Rogers, pitcher (1914–1916)

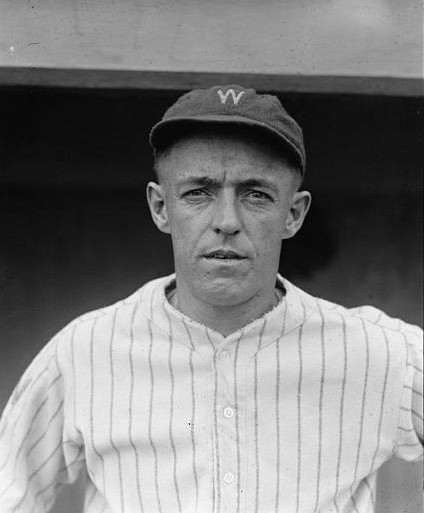
Dutch Ruether, pitcher (1932)

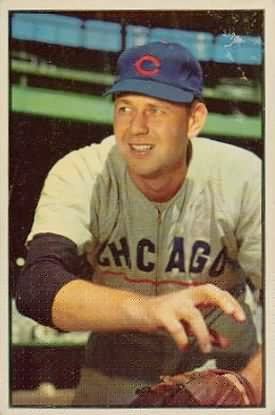
Bob Rush, pitcher (1947)

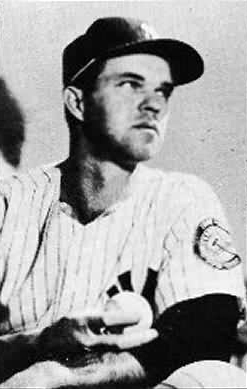
Johnny Sain, pitcher (1940–1941)

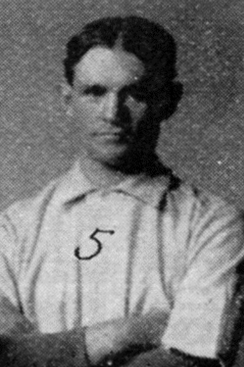
War Sanders, pitcher (1901–1902)

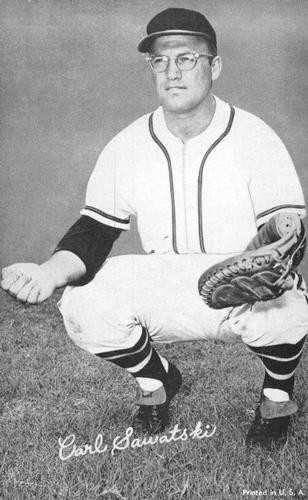
Carl Sawatski, player (1949–1950)

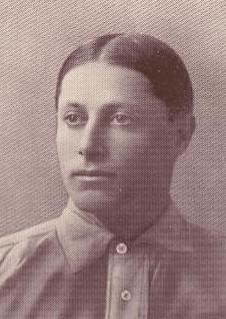
Henry Schmidt, player (1906–1907)

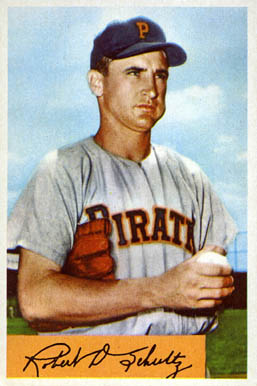
Bob Schultz, pitcher (1950–1951, 1956)

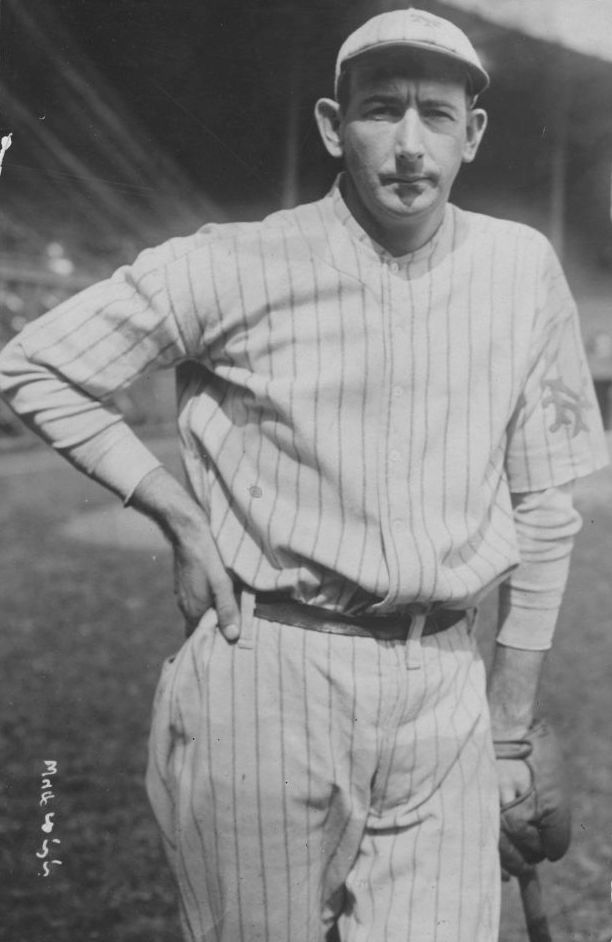
Jack Scott, pitcher (1917)

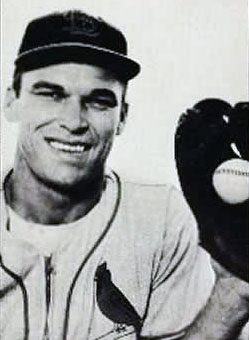
Dick Sisler, first baseman (1957–1958)

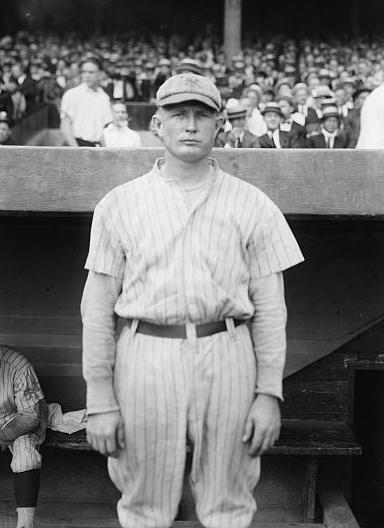
Earl Smith, catcher (1931)

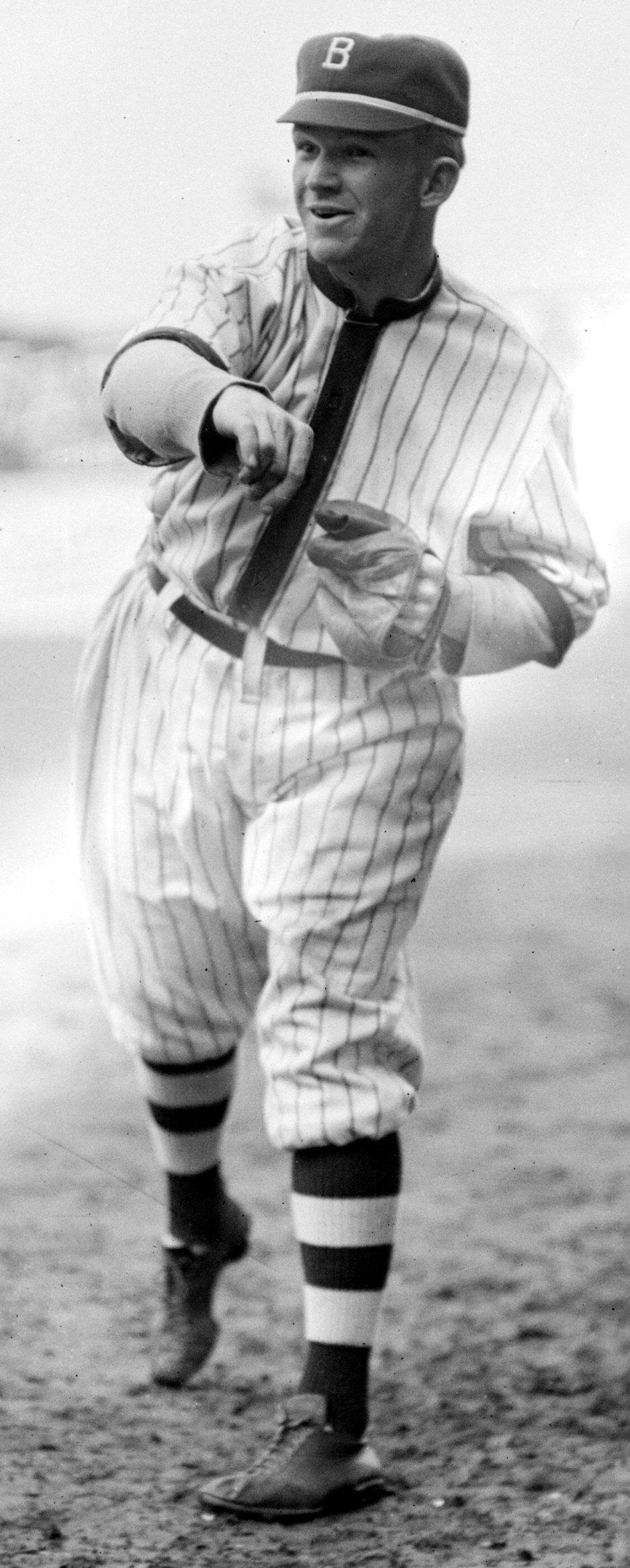
Red Smith, outfielder (1911, 1927)

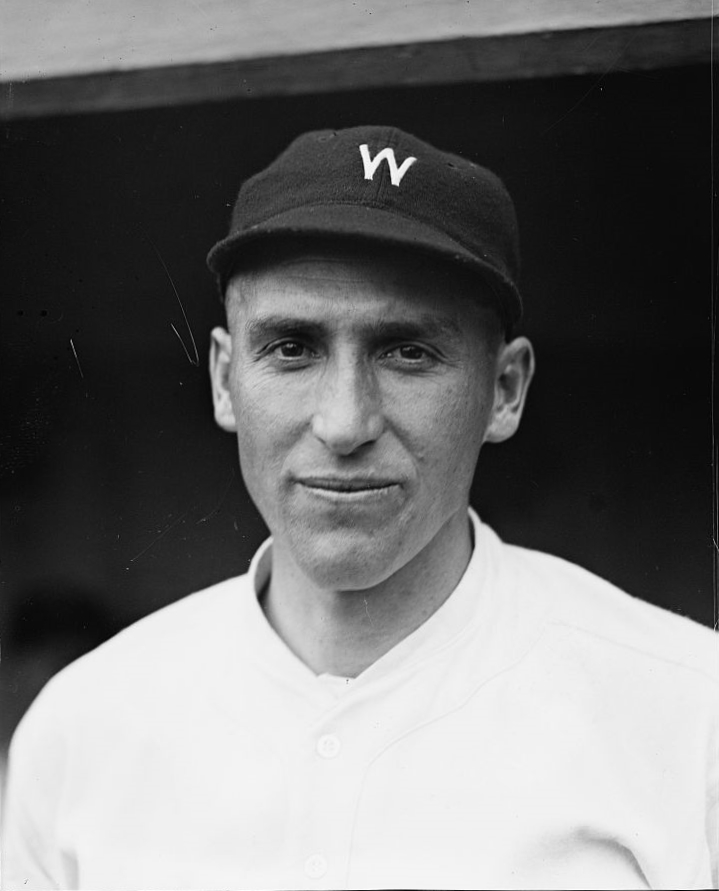
By Speece, pitcher (1932–1938)

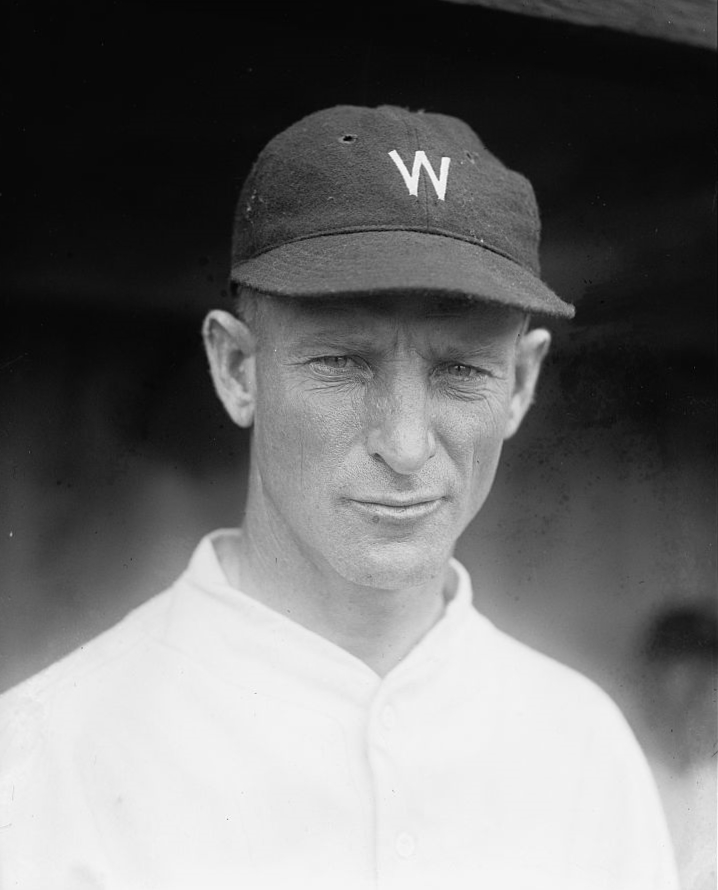
Tommy Taylor, third baseman (1928)

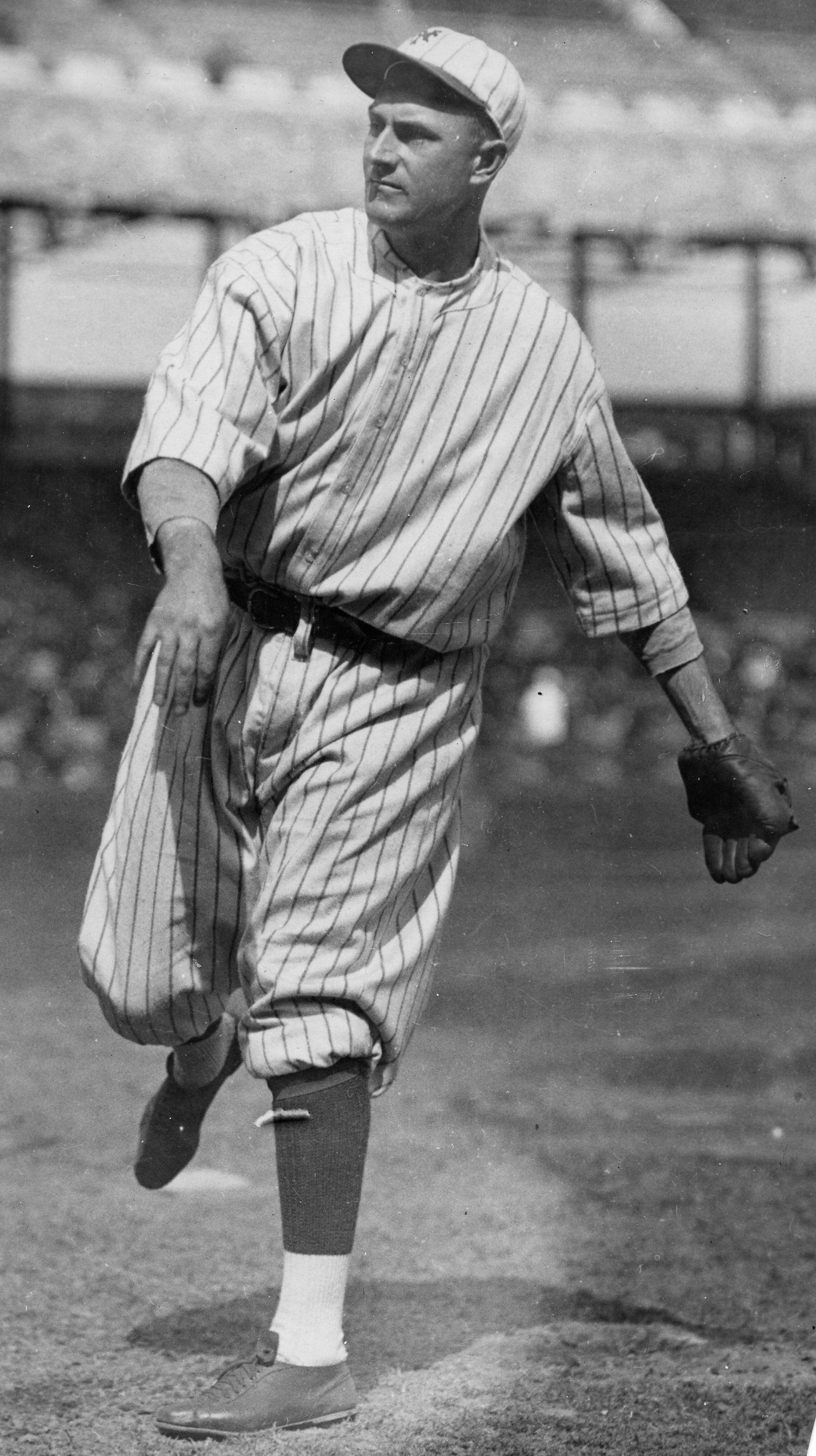
Fred Toney, pitcher (1925)

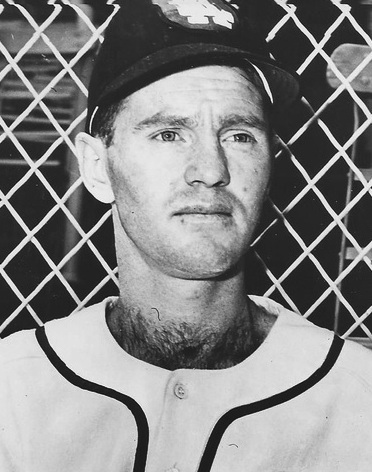
Red Treadway, player (1947)

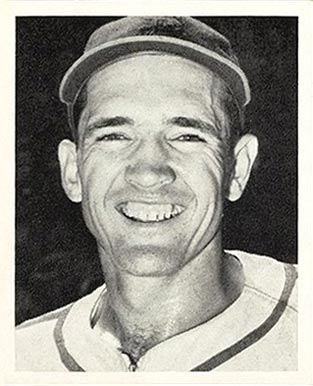
Coaker Triplett, outfielder (1936)

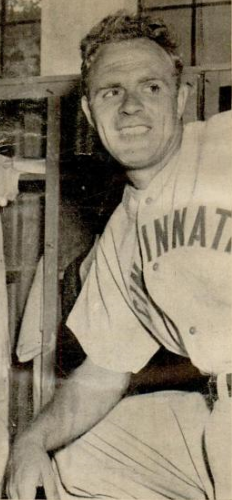
Johnny Vander Meer, pitcher (1936)

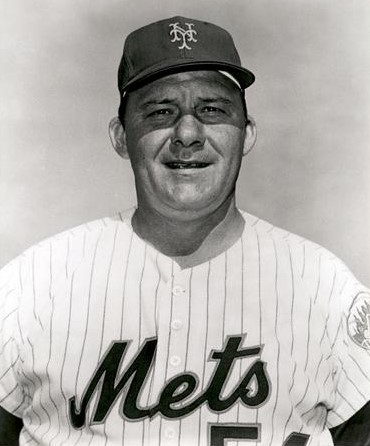
Rube Walker, player (1945, 1947)

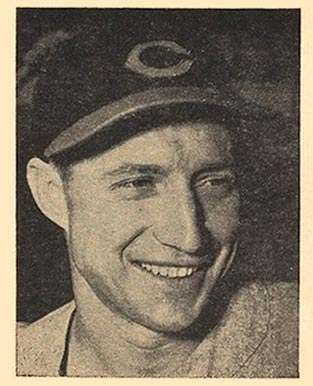
Bucky Walters, player (1931)

Lefty Williams, pitcher (1913)

Doc Wiseman, outfielder (1901–1911)

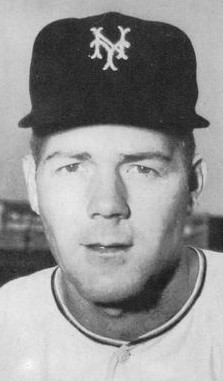
Al Worthington, pitcher (1951–1952)

Players
Name	Season(s)	Position(s)	MLB
Ed Abbaticchio	1901–1902	—	Yes
Tom Accardo	1945	—	No
Victor Accorsini	1902, 1904–1905	—	No
Tom Acker	1955	P	Yes
Dick Adair	1952–1953	P	No
Ace Adams^{†} (Note: Ace Adams: NL All-Star (1973))	1938–1940	P	Yes
Clyde Adams	1905	P	No
Spencer Adams	1929–1931	SS/3B	Yes
Ben Ahmann	1925	P	No
Raleigh Aitchison	1911	P	Yes
Harvey Albrecht	1924	—	No
Dale Alderson	1943–1944, 1946	P	Yes
Dale Alexander	1937	1B	Yes
Donald Alfano	1949	—	No
Harry Allemang	1906	P	No
Ernie Alten	1924, 1926–1928	P/OF	Yes
Ultus Álvarez	1955, 1959–1960	OF	No
Eddie Ancherico	1947	P	No
Bob Anderlik	1951	—	No
H. Anderson	1920	2B	No
Herb Anderson	1958	—	No
John D. Anderson	1931	C	No
John M. Anderson	1929–1930	OF	No
Wingo Anderson	1911	P	Yes
Doc Andrews	1904	—	No
Lee Anthony	1946	P	No
Dan Ardell	1963	1B	Yes
Bob Asbjornson	1930	C	Yes
Jim Atchley	1950–1952	P	No
James Atkins	1955–1956	P	Yes
Chick Autry	1925	C	Yes
Earl Averill Jr.	1955	—	Yes
Dick Aylward	1949, 1958	C	Yes
Gene Bacque	1961	P	No
Harvey Bailey	1905	P	Yes
Jim Bailey	1958–1960	P	Yes
King Bailey	1902–1903	P	Yes
Frank Bair	1911–1912	P	No
Al Baker	1939	P	Yes
Bill Baker	1932–1933	C	Yes
Howard Baker	1918	3B	Yes
Howard W. Baker	1915–1916	—	No
Joseph Baker	1946, 1950	P	No
R. Baker	1919	P	No
Jack Baldschun	1960	P	Yes
Frank Baldwin	1955–1956	—	Yes
Jim Ballantyne	1901	—	No
Pelham Ballenger	1920	3B	Yes
Ernest Balser	1944–1946	P	No
Oscar Bandelin	1905	—	No
Turner Barber	1928	OF	Yes
Babe Barna	1949, 1951	—	Yes
Junie Barnes	1936–1937	P	Yes
Dean Barnhardt	1918	P	No
Charley Baron	1938	—	No
Bob Barr	1939	P	Yes
Red Barrett	1950–1951	P	Yes
John Bates	1925–1927	SS/3B	No
Matt Batts	1956	—	Yes
Ray Bauer	1951	P	No
Clarence Baumgardner	1913	3B	No
Harry Bay	1908–1911	OF	Yes
Frank Beaty	1946–1947	P	No
Johnny Beazley	1949	P	Yes
John Bebber	1955	P	No
Erve Beck	1906	1B	Yes
George Beck	1913–1914	P	Yes
William Beck	1959	P	No
Becker	1906	—	No
Heinz Becker	1946	—	Yes
George Bell	1931–1932	P	No
Marty Beltran	1963	—	No
Bennett	1919	P	No
Bennett	1931	OF	No
Fred Bennett	1938	—	Yes
H. Bennett	1930	P	No
Pug Bennett	1904–1905	—	Yes
Heinie Berger	1914–1915	P	Yes
Bill Bernhard* (Note: Bill Bernhard managed the team from 1908 to 1910.)	1908–1910	P	Yes
Ray Berns	1954	—	No
Al Bernsen	1923	1B	No
Red Bird	1924	P	Yes
Ralph Birkofer	1938	P	Yes
Ralph Birkofer	1955	P	No
Frank Biscan	1955	P	Yes
Hiram Bithorn	1949	P	Yes
Jim Bivin	1937	—	Yes
Bill Black	1927–1928	2B	Yes
George Blackburn	1901	—	Yes
Rae Blaemire	1935–1936, 1938–1939	C	Yes
Linc Blakely	1937	OF	Yes
Marv Blaylock	1959	1B	Yes
Cy Block	1946–1947	—	Yes
George Boehler	1930	P	Yes
Buster Boguskie	1947–1954	2B	No
Red Bohannon	1905–1906	2B	No
Bob Boken	1940	3B	Yes
Bernie Boland	1913–1914	P	Yes
Ray Bond	1963	C	No
Bool	1928	C	No
Bob Boring	1952–1953	3B	No
Bob Borkowski	1949	—	Yes
Joseph Borrelli	1954	—	No
Rick Botelho	1955–1957	P	No
Abe Bowman	1923	P	Yes
Billy Bowman	1957	P	No
Bob Bowman	1942	P	Yes
Ben Boyd	1928	SS	No
John Brackenridge	1913	P	Yes
Hugh Bradley	1921	1B	Yes
Bob Brady	1951	—	Yes
Jim Bragan	1956	—	No
Frank Brazill* (Note: Frank Brazill managed the team in 1935.)	1935	1B	Yes
John Brechin	1956–1957	P	No
Bill Breitenstein	1902	P	No
Orbie Brewer	1945	—	No
Charlie Brewster	1942–1945	SS	Yes
Warren Bridgens	1937	—	No
Lynn Bridwell	1961	P	No
Jim Brillheart	1933–1934	P	Yes
Leon Brinkopf	1949	—	Yes
Herman Bronkie	1910	—	Yes
John Brooks	1927–1928	OF	No
Jim Brosnan	1950	P	Yes
Bill Brown	1920–1922	1B	No
Keith Brown	1954	P	No
Lindsay Brown	1938	SS	Yes
Philip Brown	1963	P	No
Ralph Brown	1956	—	No
Tommy Brown	1955–1958	3B	Yes
Will Bruner	1901, 1905	—	No
Ed Bruyette	1905	—	Yes
Frank Buchanan	1903	—	No
Jim Buchanan	1906	P	Yes
Smoky Burgess^{†} (Note: Smokey Brugess: NL All-Star (1954, 1955, 1959–1, 1959–2, 1960–1, 1960–2, 1961–1, 1961–2, 1964))	1948	—	Yes
Mike Burke	1917–1922	OF	No
Howard Burkett	1925	SS	No
Gus Burleson	1932–1933	P	No
Jim Burns	1948	P	No
Otto Burns	1914	OF	No
Pete Burnside	1952, 1954	P	Yes
Ed Burt	1901	—	No
Anderson Bush	1949	P	No
Jack Bushelman	1915	—	Yes
Harry Bussey	1902–1904	—	No
William Bustle	1945, 1947	P	No
Kid Butler	1908–1909	SS/2B	Yes
John Buvid	1931	P	No
George Byam	1947–1948	—	No
Jerry Cade	1958–1960	P	No
Gene Calder	1961	P	No
Robert Caldwell	1954	—	No
Dave Callahan	1913–1915	OF	Yes
Howie Camp	1925–1926	OF	Yes
Campbell	1937	—	No
John Campbell	1901	—	No
Raymond Campbell	1941	P	No
Thad Campbell	1929–1930	P	No
Aldo Caravello	1945	—	No
Scoops Carey	1903	—	Yes
Bobby Cargo	1902–1903	—	Yes
Don Carlsen	1950	P	Yes
Bud Carlson	1943–1945	2B	No
Pat Carney	1906	OF	Yes
Bob Carpenter	1947	P	Yes
John Carr	1907	—	No
Wes Carr	1950	P	No
Blackie Carter	1929–1931	OF	Yes
Leon Carter	1959	3B/SS	No
Charlie Case	1909–1913	P	Yes
Carlos Castillo	1959	2B	No
Slick Castleman	1932–1933	P	Yes
Lou Castro	1906	SS	Yes
Pug Cavet	1917	P	Yes
Leon Chagnon	1937	—	Yes
Tiny Chaplin	1932–1935	P	Yes
Chapman	1928	2B	No
Calvin Chapman	1937–1939, 1942–1943	OF	Yes
Glenn Chapman	1937	OF	Yes
John Chapman	1931	3B	Yes
Oscar Chinique	1961	P	No
Thomas Chinn	1906	—	No
Edgar Chitwood	1944	P	No
Herbert Chmiel	1947	P	No
Neil Chrisley	1955	—	Yes
Christenbury	1925	OF	No
Christensen	1924	—	No
Joseph Christian	1961	OF	No
Robert Churchill	1943	OF	No
James Churchwell	1963	P	No
Joe Cicero	1930–1931	OF	Yes
Ted Cieslak	1948	—	Yes
George Cisar	1938–1939	—	Yes
Moose Clabaugh	1931–1932	OF	Yes
Wild Bill Clark	1905	—	No
R.L. Clarke	1915	P	No
Clifford Coggin	1958	P	No
Hy Cohen	1958	P	Yes
Chuck Coles	1958–1960	1B	Yes
Orlin Collier	1938–1939	P	Yes
Robert Colligan	1963	P	No
Collins	1903	—	No
Victor Comolli	1957–1958	C	No
George Condrick	1955	P	No
Dick Conger	1947–1948	P	Yes
Jim Constable	1952–1953	P	Yes
Dan Coogan	1906	C	Yes
Cliff Cook	1960	3B	Yes
William Cooke	1957, 1959	P	No
Jimmy Cooper	1903	—	No
Ted Corbett	1901	P	No
Mel Corbo	1963	1B	No
Chuck Corgan	1923	3B	Yes
Pearce Corley	1940	—	No
Jess Cortazzo	1929	SS	Yes
Pete Coscarart^{†} (Note: Pete Coscarart: NL All-Star (1940))	1938	2B	Yes
Steve Coscarart	1939	OF	No
Alex Cosmidis	1953–1954	2B	No
Glen Crable	1961	P	No
Walt Craddock	1960	P	Yes
Paul Crain	1942	P	No
Eddie Crawford	1963	OF	No
Bill Crouch	1937–1938	P	Yes
Jack Crouch	1934	C	Yes
Al Cuccinello	1934–1935	2B	Yes
Cookie Cuccurullo	1948–1949	P	Yes
Charlie Cuellar	1944	P	Yes
Bert Cueto	1963	P	Yes
Dick Culler	1940–1941	SS	Yes
Jesse Cumby	1947	—	No
Kiki Cuyler^{†} (Note: Kiki Cuyler: National Baseball Hall of Fame (1968), NL All-Star (1934))	1923	OF	Yes
Angelo Dagres	1957	OF	Yes
Cy Dahlgren	1913	P	No
Alvin Dahlin	1920	P	No
Jud Daley	1912–1913	OF	Yes
Joe Damato	1948–1951	—	No
Bill Dammann	1902, 1906	P	Yes
Larry Danforth	1963	P	No
Don Dangleis	1957	P	No
Bob Dant	1950	—	No
Jake Daubert^{†} (Note: Jake Daubert: NL MVP Award (1913))	1908	1B	Yes
Bill Davidson	1961	SS	No
Larry Davidson	1959–1961	OF	No
Davis	1923	P	No
Bud Davis	1931	1B	Yes
G. Davis	1927	OF	No
Gene Davis	1961	3B	No
Jerry Davis	1956–1957, 1959, 1961	P	No
Kiddo Davis	1927	—	Yes
Peaches Davis	1936	P	Yes
Spencer Davis	1950–1951	P	No
Yancy Davis	1925	OF	No
Jean Davison	1947–1949	P	No
John Davolio	1961	P	No
Jerry Dean	1955	P	No
Walter Deaver	1902	P	No
Art Decatur	1917–1919	P	Yes
Al Decker	1908	OF	No
Peter Deem	1943	—	No
Lawrence DelMargo	1963	P	No
Walter Derucki	1955	—	No
Vincent DiLorenzo	1952	P	No
Ben Dimond	1915	—	No
Larry DiPippo	1954–1955	—	No
Sonny Dixon	1961	P	Yes
John Dobbs* (Note: John Dobbs managed the team in 1907.)	1907	—	Yes
Lou Dobbs	1901	—	No
Robert Dobzanski	1958	P	No
Marvin Dodd	1920	P	No
John Dodge	1914–1915	3B	Yes
Donohue	1926	1B	No
Cal Dorsett	1941	P	Yes
Dutch Dotterer	1955, 1957	C	Yes
Thomas Dotterer	1959	3B	No
Whammy Douglas	1959–1960	P	Yes
Pat Downing	1905	—	No
Benjamin Downs	1955	—	No
Larry Doyle* (Note: Larry Doyle managed the team in 1922.)	1922	2B	Yes
Tom Drake	1940–1941	P	Yes
Clem Dreisewerd	1935	P	Yes
Chuck Dressen* (Note: Chuck Dressen managed the team from 1932 to 1933.)	1932–1933	3B	Yes
Karl Drews	1958	P	Yes
William Droll	1931	P	No
Jim Duckworth	1960	P	Yes
Anthony Dueker	1933–1934	3B	No
Gus Dugas	1939–1942	OF	Yes
Jim Duggan	1906–1908	P/OF	Yes
John Duggan	1906–1909	P	No
Willie Duke	1934, 1937–1938	OF	No
Otto Dumas	1930	OF	No
Frank Duncan	1942	P	No
Arthur Dunham	1954	—	No
Wiley Dunham	1906	—	Yes
Frank Dunlap	1945	—	No
Hank Dunn	1961	P	No
Guy Dunning	1919–1920	OF	No
Bob Duretto	1956	—	No
Durham	1911	P	No
Harry Durheim	1938	—	No
Bobby Durnbaugh	1955–1956, 1958–1959	SS	Yes
Red Durrett	1947	—	Yes
Joe Dwyer	1936	OF	Yes
Jim Dyck	1956	—	Yes
Frank Dye	1913	P	No
Burton Dziadek	1961	P	No
Earl	1922	—	No
Walter East	1908–1909	2B	No
Roy Easterwood	1945, 1947–1948	—	Yes
Vallie Eaves	1942	P	Yes
Ebel	1937	—	No
Johnny Edwards^{†} (Note: Johnny Edwards: NL Gold Glove Award (1963, 1964), NL All-Star (1963, 1964, 1965))	1960	C	Yes
Elmer Eggert	1932	2B	Yes
Ike Eichrodt	1925	OF	Yes
Paul Eiffert	1923	C	No
Sharkey Eiland	1934–1937, 1939	P	No
Pete Elko	1943–1944, 1946–1947	3B	Yes
Roy Ellam* (Note: Roy Elam managed the team from 1916 to 1920.)	1916–1920	SS	Yes
Rowdy Elliott	1912	—	Yes
William Ellis	1916–1917, 1925–1926	P	No
Charles Elsey	1905	—	No
Jack Ely	1905–1907	P	No
Spoke Emery	1922	OF	Yes
Frank Emmer	1931	SS	Yes
Slim Emmerich	1949–1950	P	Yes
Dale Englehorn	1937	—	No
Charlie English	1941–1942	3B	Yes
Johnny Enzmann	1924	P	Yes
Paul Erickson	1942	P	Yes
Peter Erloff	1910–1911	—	No
Buck Etchison	1945	—	Yes
George Etheridge	1943	P	No
Arthur Evans	1938	—	No
Chick Evans	1925	OF	No
Tony Faeth	1923	P	Yes
Fred Fairbanks	1922	P	No
George Fallon	1938	2B	Yes
Jim Fanning	1951	—	Yes
Jack Farmer	1915, 1920	OF	Yes
Paul Faucett	1904	—	No
Jim Feeney	1902	P	No
Marv Felderman	1940–1941	C	Yes
Harry Feldhaus	1903–1904	—	No
William Felker	1961	P	No
Ed Fernandes	1950	—	Yes
Jackie Ferrell	1961	—	No
Tony Fiarito	1935	2B	No
John Fickinger	1959	P	No
Conrad Fields	1922–1923	P	No
Bob Fisher	1924	2B	Yes
John Fisher	1907	—	No
Larry Fisher	1943	—	No
Newt Fisher* (Note: Newt Fisher managed the team from 1901 to 1905.)	1901–1905	—	Yes
Norm Fisher	1945	P	No
Raymond Fisher	1935	—	No
Showboat Fisher	1933	OF	Yes
Fitzberger	1928	OF	No
Charles Fitzgerald	1946	—	No
Umberto Flammini	1950–1952	P	No
Bill Fleet	1906	—	No
Earl Fleharty	1911–1913	P	No
Les Fleming	1941	1B	Yes
Bob Fletcher	1945	—	No
Lloyd Flippin	1928	SS	No
Tim Flood	1910	—	Yes
Floyd Fogg	1945, 1949, 1954	—	No
Leon Foulk	1949–1950	P	No
Boob Fowler	1927	3B	Yes
Norman Fox	1953	P	No
Frank Franchi	1961	C	No
Will Franks	1903	—	No
Ralph Frary	1906	1B	No
Benny Frey	1926–1929	P	Yes
Lonny Frey^{†} (Note: Lonny Frey: NL All-Star (1939, 1941, 1943))	1933	SS	Yes
George Frickie	1904–1905	P	No
Skipper Friday	1923–1924	P	Yes
Jim Fridley	1958	OF	Yes
John Frierson	1921	OF	No
Ted Fritsch	1944	—	No
Sam Frock	1918	P	Yes
Edward Frome	1902	P	No
Jack Frost	1915–1916	P	No
Oscar Fuhr	1927–1928	P	Yes
Fuhrey	1922	SS	No
Charles Fulton	1923	P	No
Earl Furlow	1961	P	No
Frank Gabler	1934	P	Yes
Thomas Gallagher	1922	P	No
Billy Gardner	1953	SS	Yes
Glenn Gardner	1943	P	Yes
Parker Garner	1944	—	No
Charlie Gassaway	1937, 1939–1943	P	Yes
Aubrey Gatewood	1963	P	Yes
Sam Gatlin	1945	—	No
Harvey Gentry	1953	OF/SS	Yes
Greek George	1939–1940, 1944	C	Yes
George Gerken	1935	OF	Yes
Dick Getter	1954	—	No
Rube Geyer	1906	P	Yes
Edward Gibson	1945	P	No
Frank Gibson	1913–1914	C	Yes
Tom Gibson	1959–1961	P	No
Robert Giddens	1954	P	No
Bob Giddings	1953	P	No
Buddy Gilbert	1958–1959, 1961	OF	Yes
Charlie Gilbert	1939, 1943, 1948	OF	Yes
George Gilbert	1924	P	No
Jack Gilbert	1906	OF	Yes
Tookie Gilbert	1949	—	Yes
Whiskers Gilbert	1925	P	No
Garth Gilchrist	1928	SS	No
Tex Giles	1928	OF	No
Johnny Gill	1939	OF	Yes
Gillenwater	1923	P	No
Paul Gillespie	1946	—	Yes
Thomas Gilroy	1909	—	No
Norman Glaser	1927–1928	P	Yes
Harry Glenn	1911–1912	—	Yes
Hank Glor	1945	P	No
Frank Goalby	1913	2B	No
John Golich	1953	OF	No
Shelby Gondolfi	1945	—	No
Johnny Gooch	1932, 1935	C	Yes
Bill Goodenough	1901–1902	—	Yes
George Gottleber	1928	3B	No
William Gould	1923, 1927	P	No
Earl Grace	1939	C	Yes
Fred Graf	1923–1924	3B	Yes
Tiny Graham	1919	1B	Yes
Eugene Granberg	1942	C	No
Charley Grant	1957	—	No
Elwood Grantham	1948	—	No
George Grantham	1934	1B	Yes
Arthur Granville	1905	—	No
August Granzig	1946	—	No
James Graves	1954	P	No
Stan Gray	1945	—	No
Guy Green	1932	P	No
Greene	1920	OF	No
Greene	1926	P	No
Doc Greene	1947	—	No
Griffith	1924	OF	No
Ross Grimsley	1955	P	Yes
Lee Grissom^{†} (Note: Lee Grissom: NL All-Star (1937))	1936	P	Yes
Don Gross	1955	P	Yes
Guess	1922	—	No
Dick Haack	1946	P	No
Bert Haas^{†} (Note: Bert Haas: NL All-Star (1947))	1938–1939	1B	Yes
Jim Hackett	1907	—	Yes
John Hafenecker	1954	—	No
Frank Haley	1927–1928	SS	No
Raymond Haley	1923	—	Yes
Hall	1928	OF	No
Thomas Hallett	1963	P	No
Clarence Hamel	1937	—	No
Jimmy Hamilton* (Note: Jimmy Hamilton managed the team from 1923 to 1928.)	1924	—	No
Richard Hamlin	1954	P	No
Harry Hammond	1911	—	No
Ray Hamrick	1943	SS	Yes
Ed Hanyzewski	1946	P	Yes
Jack Hardy	1907–1908	C	Yes
Hogan Hargrove	1911	—	No
Gail Harris	1953	1B	Yes
Jack Harshman	1951, 1953	1B/P	Yes
Edd Hartness	1946	—	No
Clint Hartung	1955	—	Yes
Walter Hartwell	1911	—	No
Gene Hasson	1939	1B	Yes
Clem Hausmann	1946	P	Yes
Chicken Hawks	1923–1924	1B	Yes
Gene Hayden	1956, 1958	P	Yes
Ray Hayworth	1927	C	Yes
Bob Hazle	1955	—	Yes
Ralph Head	1930	P	Yes
Hank Helf	1941–1942	C	Yes
Gus Helfrich	1918–1919	P	No
George Heller	1952	P	No
John Helms	1945	—	No
Ed Hemingway	1914	3B	Yes
Rollie Hemsley* (Note: Rollie Hemsley managed the team in 1949.)	1949	—	Yes
S. Hendee	1913	P	No
H.T. Hengehold	1923	P	No
Weldon Henley	1901	—	Yes
George Hennessey	1944–1945	P	Yes
Bobby Henrich	1960	SS	Yes
Whitey Hensling	1912	—	No
Ernie Herbert	1916–1917	P	Yes
Herbst	1922	—	No
Art Herman	1903–1906	P	Yes
Neal Hertweck	1956	—	Yes
John Hess	1908	P	No
Heubert	1903	—	No
Mel Hicks	1943–1944, 1946	1B	No
Whitey Hilcher	1936	P	Yes
Hugh Hill	1901–1903	P	Yes
L.E. Hinton	1913	P	No
Oris Hockett^{†} (Note: Oris Hockett: AL All-Star (1944))	1940–1941	OF	Yes
Shovel Hodge	1919–1920	P	Yes
Stew Hofferth	1937–1939	C	Yes
Solly Hofman	1913	1B/OF	Yes
Ronald Hogg	1963	OF	No
Howard Holland	1901	—	No
Al Hollingsworth	1929	—	Yes
Stan Hollmig	1956–1957	1B/OF	Yes
Bobo Holloman	1948–1951	P	Yes
Jim Holmes	1903	—	Yes
Harry Holsclaw	1934	P	No
Red Holt	1929	1B	Yes
William Homan	1939	3B	No
Kenneth Hommel	1957–1958	P	No
Hood	1928	OF	No
Jay Hook	1958	P	Yes
Dick Hoover	1947	P	Yes
James Horn	1929–1930	OF	No
Claude Horton	1947	P	No
Gene Host	1961	P	Yes
Cal Howe	1955–1957	P	Yes
Waite Hoyt^{†} (Note: Waite Hoyt: National Baseball Hall of Fame (1969))	1918	P	Yes
Calvin Humphreys	1956	P	No
George Hunter	1908	OF	Yes
Ed Hurlburt	1908	C	No
Hurt	1928	—	No
Edward Irons	1958–1959	C	No
Jackson	1919	P	No
Jerry Jacobs	1955	—	No
Tony Jacobs	1949–1950, 1957	P	Yes
Bert James	1912–1913	OF	Yes
Greg Jancich	1958	P	No
Henry Jansing	1905–1906, 1908	3B	No
Roy Jarvis	1954–1955	—	Yes
Ziggy Jasinski	1952	—	No
George Jeffcoat	1939–1942	P	Yes
Hal Jeffcoat	1946–1947	OF	Yes
Frank Jelincich	1945	—	Yes
Jake Jenkins	1954	—	No
Ned Jilton	1945	P	No
Fred Johnson	1926–1927	P	Yes
Leslie Johnson	1913	P	No
Lorne Johnson	1963	—	No
Vernon Johnson	1944	—	No
Vic Johnson	1946	P	Yes
Woody Johnson	1937–1939	P	No
Albert Johnston	1961	P	No
Bill Johnston	1903	P	No
Smead Jolley	1937	OF	Yes
Herman Jones	1932	1B	No
Ollie Jones	1931	OF	No
Bubber Jonnard	1920–1921	C	Yes
Claude Jonnard	1917–1920	P	Yes
Ev Joyner	1960–1961	OF	No
Gerald Juzek	1945	P	No
George Kalkhoff	1906	C	No
Rod Kanehl	1960–1961	2B/OF	Yes
Jay Kanzler	1905–1906	OF	No
Eddie Karas	1946	P	No
Stanley Karpinski	1951	P	No
Dick Kauffman	1916–1919	1B	Yes
Jimmie Keenan	1924	P	Yes
Joseph Keenan	1905	—	No
Earl Keiser	1922	P	No
Hugh Kellackey	1905	—	No
Win Kellum	1908–1909	P	Yes
Bob Kelly	1956–1957	P	Yes
Eddie Kenna	1926	C	Yes
Dick Kennedy	1960	—	No
Snapper Kennedy	1901–1904	—	Yes
Frank Kern	1927	OF	No
Russ Kerns	1944	—	Yes
Kestner	1922	C	No
Gus Ketchum	1924	P	Yes
Henry Keupper	1910–1911	P	Yes
Stan Keyes	1932–1933	OF	No
Frederick Kiebler	1942	P	No
Edward Kikla	1963	P	No
Vernon Kilburg	1955	P	No
Killian	1911	P	No
Kilroy	1906	—	No
John Kimble	1938	—	No
Wally Kimmick	1926	3B	Yes
Bert King	1914–1915	OF	No
Moses King	1944	—	No
Albert Kinsey	1948	P	No
Larry Kinzer	1935	2B	No
Jim Kirby	1949	—	Yes
George Kircher	1915	—	No
Ed Kirkpatrick	1963	OF/C	Yes
George Kirsch	1926–1927, 1929	P	No
Rube Kisinger	1915	P	Yes
Bobby Klaus	1959	2B	Yes
Joe Klein	1921	OF	No
Hal Kleine	1949	P	Yes
Stan Klopp	1939	—	Yes
Nap Kloza	1928	—	Yes
Joe Klugmann* (Note: Joe Klugmann managed the team from 1931 to 1932.)	1929–1932	3B	Yes
Elmer Klumpp	1939	C	Yes
Chick Knaupp* (Note: Chick Knaupp managed the team in 1921.)	1920–1922	2B	No
Pete Knisely	1917–1918	OF	Yes
Punch Knoll	1902–1904	—	Yes
Cliff Knox	1928	C	Yes
Frank Kohlbecker	1919–1920	OF/C	No
Dick Kokos	1956	—	Yes
Thomas Korczowski	1953	SS	No
Art Kores	1916–1917	3B	Yes
Kraft	1923	P	No
Steve Kraly	1959–1960	P	Yes
Erwin Krehmeyer	1922	SS	No
Mickey Kreitner	1942–1943	C	Yes
John Krider	1933	P	No
Rube Kroh	1914–1916	P	Yes
John Kropf	1952	—	No
John Kruckman	1947	—	No
Ernie Krueger	1929–1930	C	Yes
Stephen Kuk	1935	OF	No
Leon Kyle	1937	—	No
Edward Labanara	1944–1945	—	No
Frank Laga	1951	P	No
Dan Lally	1905	—	Yes
Jack Lamb	1937	—	No
Wally Lammers	1960	2B	No
Bobby LaMotte	1931	3B	Yes
Ken Landenberger	1956	—	Yes
Jerry Lane	1955, 1959	P	Yes
Lang	1901	—	No
Frank Lankenau	1919–1922	P	No
Glen Larsen	1932	P	No
Al Lary	1951	P	Yes
Lasley	1920	P	No
Tacks Latimer	1907	—	Yes
Ralph Lattimore	1912	—	No
Ed Lauzon	1901	—	No
Jack Law	1906	—	No
Roxie Lawson	1941	P	Yes
Bevo LeBourveau	1923–1924, 1933	OF	Yes
Billy Lee	1916	—	Yes
Hal Lee	1938	OF	Yes
Mike Lee	1963	P	Yes
George Lees	1920	C	Yes
Lou Legett	1937	C	Yes
Hank Leiber^{†} (Note: Hank Leiber: NL All-Star (1938, 1940, 1941))	1934	OF	Yes
Al Leitz	1944	—	No
Frank Leja	1960	1B	Yes
Bob Lennon	1952–1954	OF	Yes
Dixie Leverett	1914–1915	P	Yes
Earl Lewis	1904–1905	—	No
Eddie Lewis	1925, 1928	OF	No
Dick Libby	1952–1954	P	No
Gordon Lieb	1941	P	No
John Lindsay	1911–1914	SS	No
Eldon Lindsey	1942–1943	P	No
Axel Lindstrom	1924, 1926	P	Yes
John Liptak	1950, 1952	—	No
Pete Lister	1907	—	Yes
David Logan	1903	—	No
Leslie Logg	1944	P	No
Zeke Lohman	1920	P	No
Long	1925	P	No
Daniel Long	1944	—	No
Raymond Looney	1961	1B	No
Theodore Lotz	1949, 1951	—	No
Lovelace	1928	OF	No
Lloyd Lowe	1949	—	No
Dennis Lowney	1902–1904	—	No
Red Lucas	1921–1922, 1944–1945	P	Yes
Robert Lucas	1963	SS	No
Frank Luce	1930	OF	Yes
Jimmy Ludtka	1957–1958	3B/2B	No
Bill Ludwig	1913	—	Yes
Robert Ludwig	1950–1951	—	No
Don Lumley	1961	OF/1B	No
Del Lundgren	1928–1929	P	Yes
Lyle Luttrell	1958–1959	SS	Yes
Barney Lutz	1939–1940	OF	No
Michael Lutz	1956	—	No
Chuck Lybeck	1959	P	No
Robert Lyle	1943	P	No
Mike Lynch	1910	—	No
Frank Mack	1923	P	Yes
Leo Mackey	1924–1928	C	No
John Mackinson	1957	P	Yes
Ron Mahrt	1952–1953	P	No
Dominick Maisano	1961	P	No
Pete Mallory	1946–1949, 1951–1953, 1955	P	No
Alex Malloy	1911	P	Yes
Pat Malone	1942	P	No
Jim Maloney^{†} (Note: Jim Maloney: NL All-Star (1965))	1960	P	Yes
Garth Mann	1944	P	Yes
Bill Manning	1946	—	No
Joe Margoneri	1954	P	Yes
Frank Marino	1949	P	No
Roy Marion	1941–1942, 1946	SS	No
Ollie Marquardt	1930	SS	Yes
Marshall	1931	SS	No
Clarence Marshall	1916–1918	C	No
Jim Marshall	1952	—	Yes
Wiley Marshall	1914	P	No
Darrell Martin	1958	P	No
Joe Martin	1934–1935	3B	Yes
Michael Martynik	1938–1939	P	No
Jerry Marx	1963	2B	No
Masters	1935	—	No
Eddie Matteson	1923	P	Yes
A.J. Matulis	1947	P	No
Paul Mauldin	1949–1950	—	No
Samuel Mauney	1961	C	No
Carmen Mauro	1948	—	Yes
Buster Maynard	1947	—	Yes
Ralph McAdams	1933–1934	C	No
Tom McAvoy	1961	P	Yes
Edwin McBee	1944	—	No
Joe McCabe	1961	C	Yes
Tommy McCabe	1915	—	No
Dutch McCall	1942–1943, 1946	P	Yes
Alex McColl	1930	P	Yes
Arthur McConnell	1945	P	No
Sam McConnell	1918	2B	No
Edward McCormack	1922	OF	No
Frank McCormick^{†} (Note: Frank McCormick: NL All-Star (1938, 1939, 1940, 1941, 1942, 1943, 1944, 1945, 1946))	1935	1B	Yes
Mike McCormick	1907–1908	SS	Yes
Ed McDade	1950	—	No
Ashley McDaniel	1937	SS	No
Joe McDonald	1912	—	Yes
Tex McDonald	1919	3B	Yes
Pryor McElveen	1907–1908	3B	Yes
Dan McFarland	1905	—	No
Monte McFarland	1902	—	Yes
McGee	1926	1B	No
Bill McGhee	1936	1B	Yes
Jim McGlothlin^{†} (Note: Jim McGlothlin: AL All-Star (1967))	1963	P	Yes
Harry McIntire	1902	P	Yes
Polly McLarry	1926–1927	1B	Yes
Hub McLeod	1915	P	No
Joe McManus	1913	P	Yes
John McManus	1945	—	No
Frank McMillan	1945	—	No
Tommy McMillan	1923	SS	Yes
William McMillan	1952	—	No
Jim McNamee	1963	P	No
Pat McNulty	1929	OF	Yes
Hartley McPherson	1945	P	No
George McQuillan	1922–1923	P	Yes
Johnny Meador	1917	P	Yes
Rufus Meadows	1935	P	Yes
Russ Meers	1940–1941, 1946	P	Yes
Bob Meisner	1961	3B	No
Jim Melton	1955	P	No
Gould Menefee	1911	—	No
Paul Menking	1950	P	No
Glen Merklen	1961	1B	No
Merville	1931	OF	No
Metz	1919	P	No
Leo Meyer	1919	2B	Yes
Russ Meyer	1944–1946, 1957	P	Yes
Gilbert Meyers	1922	C	No
Joseph Micciche	1952	P	No
Ralph Michaels	1923	SS	Yes
Mollie Mies	1920	P	No
John Mihalic	1939–1944	2B	Yes
Stan Milankovich	1951	P	No
Johnny Miljus	1922	P	Yes
Archie Miller	1932	P	No
Dusty Miller	1906	OF	Yes
George Miller	1963	P	No
Willie Mills	1907	—	Yes
George Milstead	1929–1932	P	Yes
H.H. Minatree	1923	P	No
David Miner	1929–1930	C	No
Henry Mitchell	1963	OF	No
Pete Modica	1950–1954	P	No
Bill Moisan	1948	P	Yes
Eddie Mooers	1918	—	No
Leo Moon	1928	P	Yes
Andrew Moore	1934	OF	No
Bill Moore	1930	C	Yes
C. Moore	1924	—	No
Dee Moore	1937	C	Yes
Jim Moore	1955	—	No
Bob Moorhead	1959	P	Yes
Jake Mooty	1943	P	Yes
Moran	1919	3B	No
Forrest More	1913–1914	P	Yes
George Morgan	1923–1924	P	No
Vern Morgan	1950	—	Yes
Ed Morris	1925–1926	P	Yes
Robert Morris	1924	P	No
Bob Morrow	1920, 1922	C	No
Frank Morse	1907–1908	2B	No
Harry Morse	1921–1922	3B	No
Arnie Moser	1940	OF	Yes
Charles Moss	1903	—	No
Ray Moss	1935	P	Yes
Mowry	1931	OF	No
Heinie Mueller	1934	OF	Yes
Red Munson	1911	—	Yes
Red Murff	1951	P	Yes
Dick Murphy	1957	—	Yes
Frank Murphy	1923	—	No
Murray	1920	P	No
Bobby Murray	1923–1924	2B/SS	Yes
Glenn Murray	1935, 1937	OF	No
Tommy Mylett	1901	—	No
Alfred Nagel	1960	OF	No
Sam Nahem	1939	P	Yes
Cholly Naranjo	1959–1960	P	Yes
Joe Neely	1912	P	No
Tommy Neill	1950, 1952	—	Yes
Ernie Neitzke	1926	OF	Yes
Clarence Nelson	1907	P	No
Wallace Newell	1920	OF	No
Don Nicholas	1957	OF	Yes
Art Nichols	1907	—	Yes
Ovid Nicholson	1913	—	No
Harry Nickens	1903–1905	P	No
Johnny Niggeling	1933	P	Yes
John Nook	1942	—	No
Frank Norcum	1905–1906	—	No
Leo Norris	1931–1932	2B	Yes
Rube Novotney	1951–1953	C	Yes
Hank Nowak	1947	—	No
Eddie Noyes	1913	C	No
Harry Noyes	1909	—	No
Otto Nye	1918	2B	No
Dan Oberholzer	1931	3B	No
A. O'Brien	1926	C	No
Ray O'Brien	1917–1918	OF	Yes
Andy O'Connell	1901	—	No
Dave Odom	1945	P	Yes
Henry Oellerman	1919	OF	No
Jim Oglesby	1928	1B	Yes
John Oldham	1957	P	Yes
Tom Oliver	1927	OF	Yes
Barney Olsen	1941	OF	Yes
Ole Olsen	1924–1925	P	Yes
Paul O'Malley	1934, 1936	C	No
Mickey O'Neil	1918	C	Yes
Peaches O'Neill	1906	—	Yes
William O'Neill	1923–1924	P	No
Bill Onuska	1960	C	No
James Orton	1963	2B/3B	No
Don Osborn* (Note: Don Osborn managed the team from 1950 to 1951.)	1950	P	No
Tiny Osborne	1926	P	Yes
Claude Osteen^{†} (Note: Claude Osteen: NL All-Star (1967, 1970, 1973))	1957	—	Yes
Jim O'Toole^{†} (Note: Jim O'Toole: NL All-Star (1963))	1958	P	Yes
Jimmy Outlaw	1936	3B	Yes
William Padget	1954	P	No
Jose Padilla	1958	3B	No
Pat Paige	1913	P	Yes
Stan Palys	1957	OF	Yes
Emil Panko	1958	OF	No
Nick Pappas	1954	P	No
Roy Pardue	1952, 1955–1957	P	No
Frank Parkinson	1925	2B	Yes
Parks	1931	P	No
Art Parks	1935, 1938	OF	Yes
Tom Parrott	1901, 1903–1904	—	Yes
Jay Partridge	1926, 1929–1930	2B	Yes
Dode Paskert	1924	OF	Yes
Roy Paton	1946	—	No
Ham Patterson	1910	—	Yes
Gene Paulette	1914–1915	1B	Yes
Bill Pavlick	1952–1953	OF	No
Ted Pawelek	1946–1947	—	Yes
George Payne	1920–1921	P	Yes
Johnny Peacock	1936	C	Yes
Frank Pearce	1931–1932	P	Yes
Les Peden	1948	—	Yes
Homer Peel	1934	OF	Yes
Marvin Pelton	1938	OF	No
Joe Penland	1963	P	No
Joe Pepe	1921	SS	No
Hub Perdue* (Note: Hub Perdue managed the team from 1907 to 1908 and in 1921.)	1905, 1907–1910, 1920–1921	P	Yes
Olin Perritt	1923	OF	No
Clay Perry	1911–1913	2B/3B	Yes
Archie Persons	1906–1907	OF	No
Charlie Pescod	1942	P	No
Lee Peterson	1948	P	No
Roy Peterson	1950	—	No
Raymond Petrzelka	1954	P	No
Jimmy Phelan	1957	P	No
Philbin	1928	3B	No
Alva Phillips	1945	—	No
Darrell Phillips	1944	P	No
Eddie Phillips	1927	C	Yes
Wiley Piatt	1904	P	Yes
Malcolm Pickett	1928	1B	No
Lerton Pinto	1923	P	Yes
Ed Pipgras	1928	P	Yes
George Pipgras	1925, 1935	P	Yes
Forrest Plass	1906	2B	No
Whitey Platt	1943	OF	Yes
Rance Pless	1952	—	Yes
Boots Poffenberger	1940–1941	P	Yes
Jennings Poindexter	1945	P	Yes
Billy Poland	1953	—	No
Jim Poole	1929–1930	1B	Yes
E.J. Porter	1921	OF	No
Ned Porter	1927	P	Yes
Al Porto	1951	P	Yes
Robert Pottenger	1953–1954	C	No
Dykes Potter	1939	P	Yes
Coleman Powell	1946	—	No
Dutch Prather	1933–1934	1B	No
Monte Priest	1911	P	No
Jim Pruett	1950	—	Yes
Burt Pulford	1942	P	No
Pid Purdy	1935	OF	Yes
Hal Quick	1946–1949	—	Yes
Witty Quintana	1958	2B/3B	No
Charlie Rabe	1956, 1960	P	Yes
Neal Rabe	1932	C	No
John Radulovich	1950	—	No
Bill Raehse	1955	—	No
Pep Rambert	1946	P	Yes
Earl Rapp	1959	OF	Yes
Charlie Ray	1949–1950, 1952	—	No
Sidney Ray	1939	—	No
William Rea	1932–1933	C	No
Art Rebel	1938	—	Yes
Phil Redding	1913	P	Yes
Buck Redfern	1926–1927	SS	Yes
James Reggio	1944	—	No
Jackie Reid	1932–1934	P	No
Phil Reisinger	1906	—	No
George Reitz	1901–1902	—	No
Erwin Renfer	1914	P	Yes
Flint Rhem	1936	P	Yes
Dusty Rhodes^{†} (Note: Dusty Rhodes: Babe Ruth Award (1954))	1952	—	Yes
Pete Rhodes	1948	P	No
Pete Ricci	1922	C	No
Harry Rice	1934	OF	Yes
Duane Richards	1960	P	Yes
Fred Richards	1950	—	Yes
Thomas Richards	1960	P	No
Lance Richbourg* (Note: Lance Richbourg managed the team in 1934 and from 1936 to 1937.)	1923, 1933–1937	OF	Yes
Harry Riconda	1931	3B	Yes
Bob Rikard	1961	—	No
Riley	1906	—	No
Walter Ringhofer	1943	C	No
Pep Ripperton	1922	OF	No
Dean Robbins	1963	OF	No
Red Robbins* (Note: Red Robbins managed the team in 1961.)	1961	3B	No
Jack Roberts	1956	—	No
Jim Roberts	1923	P	Yes
Don Robertson	1956	—	Yes
James Robertson	1909	—	No
Fred Robinson	1933	P	No
Paul Robinson	1959–1960	P	No
Wilbur Robinson	1937	—	No
Mickey Rocco	1940, 1946	1B	Yes
Bill Rodda	1931–1939	SS	No
Howard Rodemoyer	1959	P	No
Eric Rodin	1954	—	Yes
Lee Rogers	1940	P	Yes
Packy Rogers	1941	3B	Yes
Tom Rogers	1914–1916	P	Yes
John Romonosky	1961	P	Yes
Rose	1921	—	No
Walter Rospond	1937–1939	3B	No
Cliff Ross	1955	P	Yes
Donald Ross	1963	OF	No
Andy Roth	1903	—	No
Ralph Rowe	1951	OF	No
Luther Roy	1925	P	Yes
Art Ruble	1926	OF	Yes
Dutch Ruether	1932	P	Yes
Bob Rush^{†} (Note: Bob Rush: NL All-Star (1950, 1952))	1947	P	Yes
Clyde Russell	1903–1906	P	No
Jack Rutledge	1922	SS	No
Ralph Sabatino	1944	—	No
Eddie Sabrie	1909	—	No
William Sahlin	1943	P	No
Johnny Sain^{†} (Note: Johny Sain: NL All-Star (1947, 1948), AL All-Star (1953))	1940–1941	P	Yes
Manny Salvatierra	1944	—	No
Guy Sample	1901–1902, 1905	P	No
Ken Sanders	1963	P	Yes
Roy Sanders	1929–1930	P	Yes
War Sanders	1901–1902	P	Yes
Bill Sarni	1945	—	Yes
Tom Satriano	1963	C/3B	Yes
Ed Sauer	1943	OF	Yes
Neil Saulia	1947–1948	P	No
Carl Sawatski	1949–1950	—	Yes
George Scharein	1935–1936	SS	Yes
Hank Schenz	1947	—	Yes
George Schmees	1956–1958	OF	Yes
Freddy Schmidt	1948	P	Yes
Haven Schmidt	1958–1960	C	No
Henry Schmidt	1906–1907	—	Yes
Keith Schmidt	1955–1956	—	No
Jake Schmitt	1953	P	No
Paul Schneiders	1951	P	No
Grant Schopp	1907	—	No
Bob Schultz	1950–1951, 1956	P	Yes
Bill Schwartz* (Note: Bill Schwartz managed the team from 1911 to 1915.)	1910–1915	1B	Yes
Rudy Schwenck	1905	—	Yes
Jack Scott	1917	P	Yes
LeGrant Scott	1942	OF	Yes
Warren Seabough	1908–1912	C	No
John Sebastian	1947	—	No
Duke Sedgwick	1924	P	Yes
Larry Segovia	1957	OF	No
Louis Seguin	1939	P	No
Gene Seifert	1945	P	No
Joseph Semler	1935	P	No
Sonny Senerchia	1956	P	Yes
Mel Serafini	1947	—	No
Merle Settlemire	1932	—	Yes
Wally Seward	1960–1961	P	No
Rip Sewell^{†} (Note: Rip Sewell: NL All-Star (1943, 1944, 1945, 1946))	1931	P	Yes
Wally Shaner	1929	OF	Yes
Phil Shartzer	1957, 1959–1961	SS	No
Al Shealy	1932	P	Yes
Ray Shearer	1959	OF	Yes
Thomas Sheehan	1915–1917	2B	No
Frederick Sherkel	1952, 1954–1955	P	No
Charlie Shields	1901	—	Yes
Jim Shilling	1941–1942, 1946	1B	Yes
Mule Shirley	1931–1932, 1935	1B	Yes
Charlie Shoemaker	1963	2B	Yes
Johnny Siegle	1908–1910	OF	Yes
Tripp Sigman	1928	OF	Yes
Walter Signer	1943	P	Yes
Don Sikes	1925–1926	OF	No
Pat Simmons	1931–1932	P	Yes
Paul Simmons	1954	—	No
Syl Simon	1930	3B	Yes
Sims	1924	—	No
Duke Sims	1963	C	Yes
William Simunek	1952	—	No
James Singleton	1953	P	No
Mike Sinnerud	1963	3B	No
Dick Sisler* (Note: Dick Sisler managed the team from 1957 to 1959.)	1957–1958	1B	Yes
Carl Sitton	1908	P	Yes
Willie Skeen	1941	—	No
Lou Skizas	1960	3B	Yes
Tod Sloan	1914	OF	Yes
Smith	1921	OF	No
Earl Smith	1931	C	Yes
Ernie Smith	1922	OF	No
Frank Smith	1956	P	Yes
Norman Smith	1941	P	No
Red Smith	1911, 1927	OF	Yes
Red Smith	1914–1915	—	Yes
Robert Smith	1913	—	No
Tom Smith	1904	—	No
Zach Smith	1931–1933, 1935	OF	No
Clifford Snyder	1913	P	No
Lewis Solomon	1944	—	No
Rudy Sommers	1912–1913	P	Yes
Bill Sorrells	1906–1908	P	No
Bill Sparger	1901	—	No
Bob Speake	1951	—	Yes
By Speece	1932–1938	P	Yes
Ben Spencer	1926	OF	No
Daryl Spencer	1951	—	Yes
Leverette Spencer	1961	P	No
Bob Spicer	1948	P	Yes
James Sprankle	1957–1958	P	No
Harry Spratt	1913	3B/SS	Yes
Bob Sprout	1963	P	Yes
James St. Claire	1957	—	No
Marv Staehle	1963	SS	Yes
Harold Stafford	1934–1935	P	No
Robert Stafford	1906	1B	No
George Staller	1941	OF	Yes
Harold Stamey	1955	—	No
Jerry Standaert	1930	3B	Yes
Chuck Staniland	1961	C	No
Lawrence Stankey	1960	1B	No
Dolly Stark	1915	—	Yes
Ray Starr^{†} (Note: Ray Starr: NL All-Star (1942))	1936–1939	P	Yes
George Stassi	1945	—	No
Willie Statham	1920–1921	P	No
Irv Stein	1945	P	Yes
Bill Stellbauer	1921	OF	Yes
Stanley Stencel	1942	OF	No
Stephens	1952	P	No
Clyde Stevens	1952	P	No
Roger Stevens	1914	—	No
Beauty Stewart	1921	—	No
Bill Stewart	1920	P	No
Mack Stewart	1943–1945	P	Yes
Edward Stogoski	1961	C	No
Henry Stone	1945	P	No
Harry Storch	1911–1912	—	No
Dewey Stover	1929	OF	No
Gabby Street	1915–1917, 1919	C	Yes
Joseph Strincevich	1945	P	No
Joe Stringfellow	1946–1947	—	No
Harry Strohm	1925	3B	No
Stuart	1928	—	No
George Stumpf	1931	OF	Yes
Joseph Stupak	1954	P	No
Jim Suchecki	1954	P	Yes
Ronald Suleski	1958	C	No
Ernie Sulik	1937	OF	Yes
James Sullivan	1901	—	No
Harry Swacina	1918	1B	Yes
Swan	1920	P	No
Bruce Swango	1961	P	No
Sweeney	1931	3B	No
Ad Swigler	1918	P	Yes
Charlie Swindells	1905	—	Yes
Doug Taitt	1927, 1934–1936	OF	Yes
Vito Tamulis	1941–1942, 1946	P	Yes
Ted Tappe	1954	—	Yes
Dan Tapson	1932	3B	No
Lee Tate	1954	—	Yes
Tommy Tatum	1940–1941	OF	Yes
Bill Taylor	1953	OF	Yes
Larry Taylor	1955–1958	2B	No
Tommy Taylor	1928	3B	Yes
Wiley Taylor	1916–1917	P	Yes
Boyd Tepler	1944–1945	P	No
Charles Teuscher	1963	OF	No
Carl Thomas	1960	P	Yes
Pete Thomassie	1946	—	No
Thompson	1922	OF	No
Foster Thornton	1938	P	No
Jimmy Thrash	1925	—	No
James Tibbetts	1906	OF	No
Jimmy Tilford	1905	—	No
Chick Tolson	1925, 1931	1B	Yes
Pat Tomkinson	1952–1953	—	No
Ed Tomlin	1920	P	No
Francis Toner	1946	P	No
Fred Toney	1925	P	Yes
Tony Tonneman	1909, 1921	C	Yes
Red Torphy	1927	2B	Yes
Eddie Touchberry	1958	P	No
Victor Trahd	1944	P	No
John Travis	1941, 1943	P	No
Red Treadway	1947	—	Yes
George Treadwell	1931	C	No
Al Treichel	1946	P	No
Coaker Triplett	1936	OF	Yes
Hal Trosky Jr.	1960	P	Yes
Julian Tubb	1941	P	No
Leo Twardy	1940–1941, 1946–1948	P	No
John Uber	1952	P	No
Robert Unglaub	1928	—	No
Bill Upton	1955–1956	P	Yes
Al Van Camp	1932	—	Yes
Johnny Vander Meer^{†} (Note: Johnny Vander Meer: NL All-Star (1938, 1939, 1942, 1943))	1936	P	Yes
Claire VanWieren	1945	P	No
Fred Vaughn	1948	—	Yes
Richard Verbic	1951	P	No
E.A. Verrett	1917	—	No
Frank Veverka	1936–1937	P	No
Paul Vickery	1944	—	No
William Viebahn	1909–1911	P	No
Theodore Vinson	1910	—	No
Juan Violá	1911	—	No
Ben Wade	1947–1949	P	Yes
Dealis Wade	1921, 1924	P	No
Rip Wade	1923, 1928	OF	Yes
Arthur Wagner	1924	OF	No
Frank Waite	1963	OF	No
Doug Walker	1954	—	No
Hub Walker	1938	OF	Yes
Ralph Walker	1945	—	No
Roy Walker	1911	P	Yes
Rube Walker	1945, 1947	—	Yes
Thomas Walker	1930	—	No
Verlon Walker	1950	—	No
Frederick Wall	1963	P	No
Joe Wall	1907	—	Yes
John Walsh	1953	P	No
Bucky Walters^{†} (Note: Bucky Walters: NL MVP Award (1939), NL All-Star (1937, 1939, 1940, 1941, 1942, 1944))	1931	—	Yes
Jack Walters	1955	P	No
Cy Warmoth	1921–1922	P	Yes
Jimmy Wasdell	1936	1B	Yes
John Waters	1963	OF	No
Watkins	1922	—	No
Linville Watkins	1935, 1937–1938	P	No
Harry Weaver	1924	P	Yes
Elmer Weingartner	1945	—	Yes
Phil Weintraub	1934	OF	Yes
Sidney Weiss	1936	1B	No
Harry Welchonce	1911–1912	—	Yes
Frank Wells	1916–1917	P	No
John Wells	1947	P	Yes
Robert Wells	1906–1907, 1924	C	No
Billy Werber	1956	—	No
Raymond Werre	1922	1B	No
Johnny Wertz	1932	P	Yes
Tony Wesoloski	1953–1954	P	No
Hi West	1912	P	Yes
Ralph West	1938	P	No
Fred White	1963	C	No
Kitty Wickham	1918–1920	OF	No
Charles Williams	1954–1956	—	No
Gus Williams	1916	—	Yes
Larry Williams	1963	P	No
Lefty Williams	1913	P	Yes
Otto Williams	1914	2B	Yes
Rinaldo Williams	1927	OF	Yes
Woody Williams	1939	SS	Yes
Delaware Willis	1904	P	No
Lefty Willis	1929–1931	P	Yes
Albert Wilson	1957	P	No
Robert Wilson	1945	—	No
Wayne Windle	1931	—	No
Jim Winford	1939	P	Yes
Ted Wingfield	1928	P	Yes
George Winn	1922	P	Yes
Hank Winston	1937	P	Yes
Eddie Wise	1915	—	No
Hughie Wise	1934	C	Yes
Doc Wiseman	1901–1911	OF	No
Whitey Wistert	1936	1B	Yes
Wood	1928	P	No
Ray Woodward	1948	P	No
Chuck Workman	1941–1942, 1948	OF	Yes
Al Worthington	1951–1952	P	Yes
Pat Wright	1923	—	No
Stan Yerkes	1907–1908	P	Yes
Earl York	1948, 1955	—	No
Del Young	1912–1913	OF	Yes
Dom Zanni	1954	P	Yes
Louis Zehner	1906–1907	—	No
Harvey Zernia	1957	OF/1B	No
Emory Zumbro	1930–1931	P	No
Jerry Zuvela	1955	—	No

== Notes ==
Table keys

MLB award winners and All-Stars

Managers
