= 1908 Nashville Vols season =

1908 Nashville Vols
- Southern Association champions
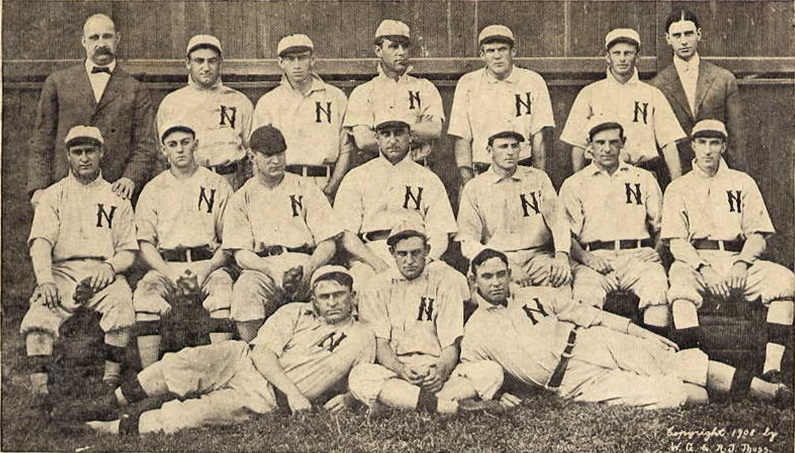
- Team photo
- League: Southern Association
- Ballpark: Sulphur Dell
- City: Nashville, Tennessee
- Record: 75–56 (.573)
- League place: 1st
- President: Ferdinand E. Kuhn
- Manager: Bill Bernhard

The 1908 Nashville Vols season was the 15th season of minor league baseball in Nashville, Tennessee, and the Nashville Vols' 8th season in the Southern Association. The Vols finished the previous season in last place, but this year won the league pennant, by defeating he New Orleans Pelicans 1-0 on the last day of the season in a game dubbed by Grantland Rice "The Greatest Game Ever Played In Dixie."

This is also the season Rice dubbed the ballpark Sulphur Dell. The team's player-manager was Bill Bernhard. The team featured just two players from Tennessee: Pryor McElveen and Hub Perdue. First baseman Jake Daubert led the league in home runs with six.

== Before the season ==
The Vols finished last place in the Southern Association in 1907. A new group of men purchased the team, including Ferdinand E. Kuhn, James B. Carr, Thomas James Tyne, J. T. Connor, James A. Bowling, Robert L. Bolling, Rufus E. Fort, and William G. Hirsig. Well known attorney S. A. Champion supplied legal services. The group envisioned an ambitious project of stadium renovations at Sulphur Dell, and managed to cull $50,000. Kuhn was selected to head the Board of Directors. He went on a trip to Ponce de Leon Park in Atlanta to observe a modern park and plan renovations.

Kuhn hired Bill Bernhard as manager.

== Schedule ==
=== Game log ===
1908 Game Log (75–56)
April (4–6)

#	Date	Opponent	Score	Win	Loss	Save	Stadium	Attendance	Record	Streak
1	April 16	@ Atlanta	1–3	**Ford** (1–0)	Sorrell (0–1)		Ponce de Leon Park	6,000	0–1	L1
2	April 17	@ Atlanta	3–0	**Duggan** (1–0)	Castleton (0–1)		Ponce de Leon Park	3,000	1–1	W1
	April 20	Montgomery	3–3			—	**Sulphur Dell**	4,400	1–1	W1
3	April 21	Montgomery	1–5	Van Ada	**Sorrell** (0–2)	—	**Sulphur Dell**	2,000	1–2	L1
4	April 22	Montgomery	5–6	Cristall	**Duggan** (1–1)	—	**Sulphur Dell**	1,500	1–3	L2
5	April 23	Montgomery	4–2	**Perdue** (1–0)	Helm	—	**Sulphur Dell**	1,500	2–3	W1
6	April 25	Birmingham	3–0	**Hess** (1–0)	Robitaille	—	**Sulphur Dell**	3,000	3–3	W2
7	April 27	Birmingham	7–6	**Hunter** (1–0)	McNeal	—	**Sulphur Dell**	1,500	4–3	W3
8	April 28	Birmingham	1–4	Fleharty	**Duggan** (1–2)	—	**Sulphur Dell**	1,500	4–4	L1
9	April 29	@ Montgomery	1–4	Thomas	**Perdue** (1–1)	—			4–5	L2
10	April 30	@ Montgomery	1–4	Stackpole	**Hess** (1–1)	—			4–6	L3

May (11–12)

#	Date	Opponent	Score	Win	Loss	Save	Stadium	Attendance	Record	Streak
11	May 1	@ Montgomery	5–0	**Kellum** (1–0)	Merriman				5–6	W1
12	May 2	@ Montgomery	1–3						5–7	L1
13	May 4	@ Birmingham	3–1	**Duggan** (2–2)	McNeal				6–7	W1
14	May 7	@ Birmingham	1–4	Turner	**Perdue** (1–2)			450	6–8	L1
15	May 8	Atlanta	1–4	Ford	**Hess** (1–2)	—	**Sulphur Dell**		6–9	L2
16	May 9	Atlanta	2–1	**Kellum** (2–0)	McKenzie	—	**Sulphur Dell**	1,500	7–9	W1
17	May 11	Atlanta	4–2	**Yerkes** (1–0)	Cummings	—	**Sulphur Dell**	1,500	8–9	W2
18	May 12	Atlanta	5–6	Ford	**Duggan** (2–3)	—	**Sulphur Dell**	2.000	8–10	L1
19	May 14	@ Memphis	6–2	**Duggan** (3–3)	Chappelle		Russwood Park		9–10	W1
20	May 15	@ Memphis	5–1	**Hess** (2–2)	Savidge		Russwood Park		10–10	W2
21	May 16	@ Memphis	3–2	**Hunter** (2–1)	Garrity		Russwood Park		11–10	W3
22	May 18	@ Little Rock	5–3	**Perdue** (2–2)	Connelly				12–10	W4
23	May 19	@ Little Rock	1–3	Hart	**Kellum** (2–1)				12–11	L1
24	May 20	@ Little Rock	1–10	Eyler	**Hess** (2–3)				12–12	L2
	May 21	@ New Orleans	0–0				Athletic Park		12–12	L2
25	May 22	@ New Orleans	1–4	Bartley	**Hunter** (2–2)		Athletic Park		12–13	L3
26	May 23	@ New Orleans	1–10	Guese	**Perdue** (2–3)		Athletic Park		12–14	L4
27	May 24	@ New Orleans	0–5	Bartley	**Hess** (2–4)		Athletic Park		12–15	L5
28	May 25	@ Mobile	2–1	**Kellum** (3–1)	Torrey		Monroe Park		13–15	W1
29	May 26	@ Mobile	10–4	**Duggan** (4–3)	Beeker		Monroe Park		14–15	W2
30	May 29	Memphis	9–1	**Hunter** (3–2)	Garrity		**Sulphur Dell**	3,000	15–15	W3
31	May 30	Memphis	0–1	Savidge	**Duggan** (4–4)		**Sulphur Dell**	4,000	15–16	L1
32	May 30	Memphis	2–5	Chappelle	**Hess** (2–5)		**Sulphur Dell**		15–17	L2
33	May 31	@ Memphis	1–4	Shields	**Perdue** (2–4)		Russwood Park		15–18	L3

June (15–10)

#	Date	Opponent	Score	Win	Loss	Save	Stadium	Attendance	Record	Streak
34	June 1	Memphis	3–1	**Kellum** (4–1)	Garrity	—	**Sulphur Dell**	1,500	16–18	W1
35	June 2	New Orleans	2–5	Guese	**Yerkes** (1–2)	—	**Sulphur Dell**	1,800	16–19	L1
36	June 4	New Orleans	3–2	**Duggan** (5–4)	Clark	—	**Sulphur Dell**	1,500	17–19	W1
37	June 5	New Orleans	5–2	**Duggan** (6–4)	Bartley	—	**Sulphur Dell**	1,800	18–19	W2
38	June 6	Mobile	2–5	Beeker	**Kellum** (4–2)	—	**Sulphur Dell**	2,800	18–20	L1
39	June 8	Mobile	8–1	**Perdue** (3–4)	Torrey	—	**Sulphur Dell**	1,400	19–20	W1
40	June 9	Mobile	1–3	Stockdale	**Yerkes** (1–3)	—	**Sulphur Dell**	1,500	19–21	L1
41	June 10	Mobile	3–0	**Duggan** (7–4)	Beeker	—	**Sulphur Dell**	1,200	20–21	W1
42	June 11	Little Rock	2–8	Eyler	**Bernhard** (0–1)	—	**Sulphur Dell**	1,599	20–22	L1
43	June 12	Little Rock	7–0	**Perdue** (4–4)	Walters	—	**Sulphur Dell**	1,200	21–22	W1
44	June 13	Little Rock	1–8	Eastman	**Kellum** (4–3)	—	**Sulphur Dell**	1,500	21–23	L1
45	June 15	Birmingham	0–6	Robitaille	**Duggan** (7–5)	—	**Sulphur Dell**	1,100	21–24	L2
46	June 16	Birmingham	5–3	**Perdue** (5–4)	Turner	—	**Sulphur Dell**	1,300	22–24	W1
47	June 17	Birmingham	6–0	**Kellum** (5–3)	Robinson	—	**Sulphur Dell**	1,500	23–24	W2
48	June 18	Montgomery	5–1	**Bernhard** (1–1)	Cristall	—	**Sulphur Dell**	1,500	24–24	W3
49	June 19	Montgomery	7–2	**Duggan** (8–5)	Guese	—	**Sulphur Dell**	1,500	25–24	W4
50	June 20	Montgomery	8–0	**Perdue** (6–4)	Juul	—	**Sulphur Dell**	3,000	26–24	W5
51	June 22	@ Atlanta	5–4	**Kellum** (6–3)	Schopp	—	Ponce de Leon Park		27–24	W6
52	June 23	@ Atlanta	5–1	**Perdue** (7–4)		—	Ponce de Leon Park		28–24	W7
53	June 23	@ Atlanta	1–4	Castleton	**Duggan** (8–6)	—	Ponce de Leon Park		28–25	L1
54	June 24	@ Atlanta	0–5	Ford	**Bernhard** (1–2)	—	Ponce de Leon Park		28–26	L2
55	June 25	@ Montgomery	3–4	Guese	**Kellum** (6–4)	—			28–27	L3
56	June 26	@ Montgomery	1–2	Thomas	**Perdue** (7–5)	—			28–28	L4
57	June 27	@ Montgomery	3–2	**Duggan** (9–6)	McCafferty	—			29–28	W1
58	June 30	Atlanta	3–1	**Duggan** (10–6)	Ford	—	**Sulphur Dell**	1,500	30–28	W2

July (16–9)

#	Date	Opponent	Score	Win	Loss	Save	Stadium	Attendance	Record	Streak
59	July 1	Atlanta	5–0	**Perdue** (8–5)	Schopp	—	**Sulphur Dell**	1,600	30–28	W3
60	July 3	@ Birmingham	5–2	**Kellum** (7–4)		—			31–28	W4
61	July 4	@ Birmingham	5–2	**Duggan** (11–6)		—		1,500	32–28	W5
62	July 5	@ New Orleans	1–2	Clark	**Perdue** (8–6)	—	Athletic Park		32–29	L1
63	July 6	@ New Orleans	2–0	**Kellum** (8–4)	Breitenstein	—	Athletic Park		33–29	W1
64	July 7	@ New Orleans	3–1	**Duggan** (12–6)	Bartley	—	Athletic Park		34–29	W2
	July 9	@ Mobile	0–0			—	Monroe Park		34–29	W2
65	July 10	@ Mobile	3–2	**Hunter** (3–3)	Gaskill	—	Monroe Park		35–29	W3
66	July 11	@ Mobile	1–2	Hickman	**Kellum** (8–5)	—	Monroe Park		35–30	L1
67	July 12	@ Mobile	6–3	**Bernhard** (2–2)	Gaskill	—	Monroe Park		36–30	W1
	July 13	@ Little Rock	3–3			—			36–30	W1
68	July 14	@ Little Rock	1–4	Hart	**Hunter** (4–3)	—			36–31	L1
69	July 15	@ Little Rock	1–2	Eastman	**Duggan** (12–7)	—			36–32	L2
70	July 15	@ Little Rock	5–4	**Kellum** (9–5)	Buchanan	—			37–32	W1
71	July 17	@ Memphis	3–2	**Perdue** (9–6)	Chappelle	—	Russwood Park		38–32	W2
72	July 18	@ Memphis	6–1	**Bernhard** (3–2)	Shields	—	Russwood Park		39–32	W3
73	July 20	Little Rock	2–1	**Duggan** (13–7)	Neuer	—	**Sulphur Dell**	3,000	40–32	W4
74	July 21	Little Rock	0–3	Buchanan	**Perdue** (9–7)	—	**Sulphur Dell**		40–33	L1
75	July 22	Little Rock	15–8	**Hunter** (5–3)		—	**Sulphur Dell**		41–33	W1
76	July 23	Mobile	0–2	Hickman	**Kellum** (9–6)	—	**Sulphur Dell**		41–34	L1
77	July 25	Mobile	4–2	**Perdue** (10–7)	Torrey	—	**Sulphur Dell**	1,800	42–35	W1
78	July 26	@ Memphis	2–1	**Bernhard** (4–2)	Garrity	—			43–35	W2
79	July 27	New Orleans	3–1	**Kellum** (10–6)	Bartley	—	**Sulphur Dell**	3,000	44–35	W3
80	July 28	New Orleans	5–7	Clark	**Hunter** (5–4)	—	**Sulphur Dell**	3,500	44–36	L1
81	July 29	New Orleans	2–0	**Bernhard** (5–2)	Fritz	—	**Sulphur Dell**	2,500	45–36	W1
82	July 30	Memphis	2–5		**Perdue** (10–8)	—	**Sulphur Dell**	2,000	45–37	L1
83	July 31	Memphis	0–1	Savidge	**Duggan** (13–8)	—	**Sulphur Dell**	1,800	45–38	L2

August (17–12)

#	Date	Opponent	Score	Win	Loss	Save	Stadium	Attendance	Record	Streak
84	August 1	Memphis	3–0	**Kellum** (11–6)	Schwenk		**Sulphur Dell**	3,500	46–38	W1
85	August 3	Birmingham	2–6	Bauer	**Perdue** (10–9)		**Sulphur Dell**	1,400	46–39	L1
86	August 4	Birmingham	15–2	**Hunter** (6–4)	Robitaille		**Sulphur Dell**	2,000	47–39	W1
87	August 5	Birmingham	13–1	**Kellum** (12–6)	Ford		**Sulphur Dell**	2,000	48–39	W2
88	August 5	Birmingham	4–5	Turner	**Duggan** (13–9)		**Sulphur Dell**		48–40	L1
89	August 6	Atlanta	6–0	**Bernhard** (6–2)	Radabaugh		**Sulphur Dell**	2,000	49–40	W1
90	August 7	Atlanta	2–1	**Sitton** (1–0)	Maxwell		**Sulphur Dell**	3,500	50–40	W2
91	August 8	Atlanta	2–0	**Hunter** (7–4)	Viebahn		**Sulphur Dell**		51–40	W3
92	August 10	Montgomery	6–1	**Duggan** (14–9)	Bliss		**Sulphur Dell**	2,400	52–40	W4
93	August 11	Montgomery	1–3	Guese	**Kellum** (12–7)		**Sulphur Dell**		52–41	L1
94	August 12	Montgomery	1–0	**Bernhard** (7–2)	Thomas		**Sulphur Dell**	2,500	53–41	W1
95	August 13	@ Atlanta	2–5	Viebahn	**Hunter** (7–5)		Ponce de Leon Park		53–42	L1
96	August 14	@ Atlanta	5–1	**Sitton** (2–0)	Ford		Ponce de Leon Park		54–42	W1
97	August 14	@ Atlanta	2–3	Johns	**Duggan** (14–10)		Ponce de Leon Park		54–43	L1
98	August 15	@ Atlanta	3–1	**Kellum** (13–7)	Maxwell		Ponce de Leon Park		55–43	W1
99	August 17	@ Montgomery	3–8	Thomas	**Sitton** (2–1)				55–44	L1
100	August 18	@ Montgomery	11–6	**Perdue** (11–9)	Juul				56–44	W1
101	August 19	@ Montgomery	6–3	**Bernhard** (8–2)	Guese				57–44	W2
	August 20	@ Birmingham	1–1						57–44	W2
102	August 21	@ Birmingham	2–6	Ford	**Kellum** (13–8)				57–45	L1
103	August 21	@ Birmingham	4–5	Thomas	**Sitton** (2–1)				57–46	L2
104	August 22	@ Birmingham	3–1	**Perdue** (12–9)	Robitaille				58–46	W1
105	August 22	@ Birmingham	0–7	Fleharty	**Perdue** (12–10)				58–47	L1
106	August 24	@ Little Rock	1–2	Eyler	**Bernhard** (8–3)				58–48	L2
107	August 25	@ Little Rock	5–3	**Duggan** (15–10)	Eastman				59–48	W1
108	August 26	@ Little Rock	4–0	**Perdue** (13–10)	Buchanan				60–48	W2
109	August 26	@ Little Rock	3–2	**Kellum** (14–8)	Hart				61–48	W3
110	August 28	@ Memphis	1–2	Schwenk	**Sitton** (2–3)		Russwood Park		61–49	L1
111	August 29	@ Memphis	1–5	Savidge	**Bernhard** (8–4)		Russwood Park		61–50	L2
	August 30	@ Memphis	2–2				Russwood Park	5,000	61–50	L2
112	August 31	@ New Orleans	2–0	**Kellum** (15–8)	Bartley	—	Athletic Park	3,300	62–50	W1

September (13–6)

#	Date	Opponent	Score	Win	Loss	Save	Stadium	Attendance	Record	Streak
113	September 1	@ New Orleans	1–0	**Sitton** (3–3)	Fritz	—	Athletic Park	3,500	63–50	W2
114	September 2	@ New Orleans	0–3	Breitenstein	**Duggan** (15–11)	—	Athletic Park	3,500	63–51	L1
	September 2	@ New Orleans	0–0			—	Athletic Park		63–51	L1
115	September 3	@ Mobile	0–1	Hickman	**Perdue** (13–11)	—	Monroe Park		63–52	L2
116	September 3	@ Mobile	2–0	**Perdue** (14–11)	Hixon	—	Monroe Park		64–52	W1
117	September 5	@ Mobile	1–4	Fisher	**Kellum** (15–9)	—	Monroe Park		64–53	L1
118	September 5	@ Mobile	10–0	**Hunter** (8–5)		—	Monroe Park		65–53	W1
119	September 7	Memphis	1–4	Schwenk	**Sitton** (3–4)		**Sulphur Dell**	3,500	65–54	L1
120	September 7	Memphis	6–3	**Duggan** (16–11)	Garrity		**Sulphur Dell**	7,500	66–54	W1
121	September 8	Memphis	10–0	**Perdue** (15–11)	Savidge		**Sulphur Dell**		67–54	W2
122	September 9	Little Rock	2–3	Hart	**Kellum** (15–10)		**Sulphur Dell**		67–55	L1
123	September 10	Little Rock	1–0	**Duggan** (17–11)	Buchanan		**Sulphur Dell**		68–55	W1
124	September 11	Little Rock	20–1	**Sitton** (4–4)			**Sulphur Dell**		69–55	W2
125	September 12	Little Rock	11–1	**Perdue** (16–11)	Hart		**Sulphur Dell**		70–55	W3
126	September 14	Mobile	10–2	**Duggan** (18–11)	Beeker		**Sulphur Dell**		71–55	W4
127	September 15	Mobile	8–2	**Sitton** (5–4)	Fisher		**Sulphur Dell**		72–55	W5
128	September 16	Mobile	10–1	**Perdue** (17–11)			**Sulphur Dell**		73–55	W6
129	September 17	New Orleans	1–5	Bartley	**Bernhard** (8–5)		**Sulphur Dell**	5,000	73–56	L1
130	September 18	New Orleans	6–2	**Duggan** (19–11)	Phillips		**Sulphur Dell**	5,000	74–56	W1
131	September 19	New Orleans	1–0	**Sitton** (6–4)	Breitenstein		**Sulphur Dell**	10,700	75–56	W2

Legend: = Win = Loss = No decision
Bold = Vols team member

=== Game summaries ===
==== April ====
===== Opening day =====
Sportswriter and Vanderbilt baseball coach Grantland Rice accompanied the team to Atlanta. President Kuhn ordered a line score hung up on a slate board outside Sulphur Dell, for local fans to follow the game.

==== June ====
===== Mike McCormick leaves =====
On June 15, team captain Mike McCormick had a heated exchange with fans and ultimately abandoned the team.

Despite this, the Vols changed the team and went on a winning streak as a result. On June 20 in an 8–0 win over Montgomery, Butler hit a then-rare, outside-the-park home run.

==== July ====
===== Seventeen inning contest =====
The seventeen-inning game on July 9 against Mobile was declared a tie. Both pitchers received praise, and Hamilton Love wrote Perdue "has done more than any one man to hold up the team."

==== August ====
===== Carl Sitton's debut =====
On August 7, Southern Association rookie Sitton debuted against the Crackers, winning a close game 2–1 and striking out eight.

==== September ====
===== Hub Perdue's doubleheader =====
On September 3, Hub Perdue pitched a shutout until the final inning, when he let a run across. He then insisted on pitching the second game of a doubleheader, and pitched a shut-out win.

===== John Duggan's no-hitter =====
On September 10, Nashville's John Duggan pitched a no-hitter, the second in team history, against the Little Rock Travelers at Sulphur Dell. Only two Little Rock batters reached base, one via walk and another on a fielding error. Nashville's Pryor McElveen, who had earlier misplayed the ball at third, drove in Doc Wiseman in the sixth inning for the only run of the game, a 1–0 win.

===== Last game vs. New Orleans =====
According to one account, "By one run, by one point, Nashville has won the Southern League pennant, nosing New Orleans out literally by an eyelash. Saturday's game, which was the deciding one, between Nashville and New Orleans was the greatest exhibition of the national game ever seen in the south and the finish in the league race probably sets a record in baseball history".

Carl Sitton's spitball defeated Ted Breitenstein 1–0 in the "Greatest Game". Sitton pitched a complete-game, nine-strikeout, four-hit, shutout.

Nashville scored in the bottom of the seventh inning. With two outs, catcher Ed Hurlburt hit a single. Then Sitton did too. Harry "Deerfoot" Bay bunted perfectly down the third base line to load the bases, Bay's fondest memory in his long baseball career. Doc Wiseman then drove in the winning run. Sitton was thrown out at home after Hurlburt scored. The time of the game was one hour and forty-two minutes.

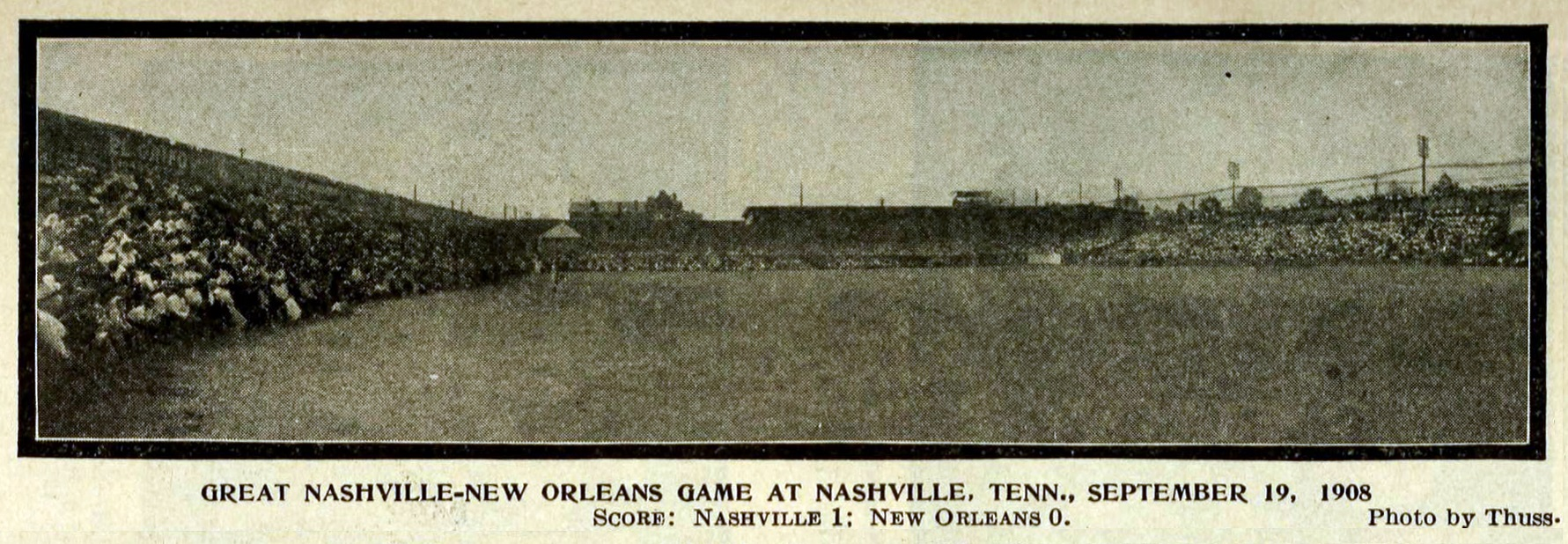
The decisive Nashville-New Orleans game

== Standings ==
=== Season standings ===
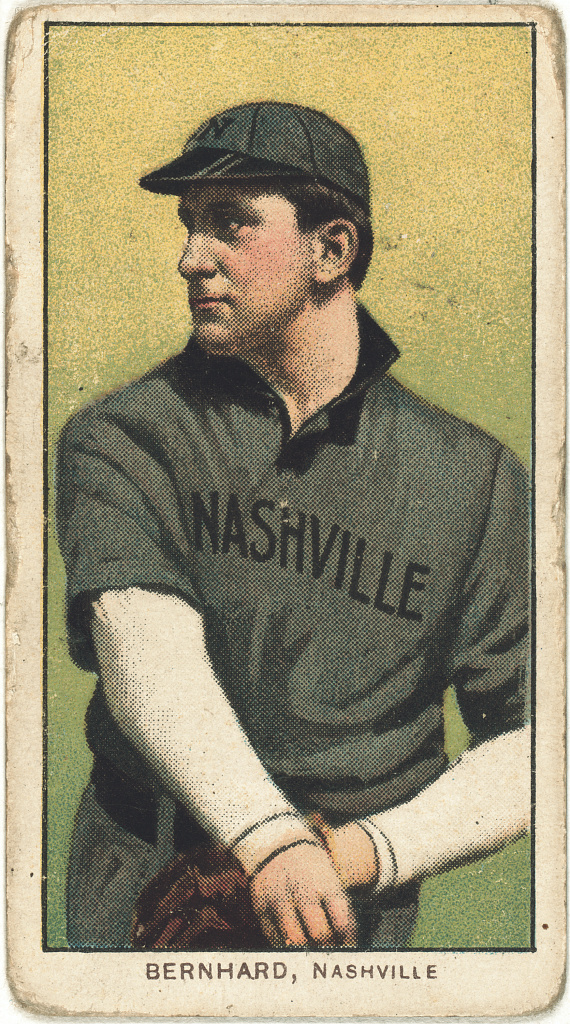
Bill Bernhard, the team's manager.

Team	W	L	Pct.	GB
Nashville Vols	75	56	.573	—
New Orleans Pelicans	76	57	.571	—
Memphis Egyptians	73	62	.541	4
Montgomery Senators	68	65	.511	8
Mobile Sea Gulls	67	67	.500	9 1/2
Atlanta Crackers	63	72	.467	14
Little Rock Travelers	62	76	.449	16 1/2
Birmingham Barons	53	82	.393	24

=== Record vs. opponents ===
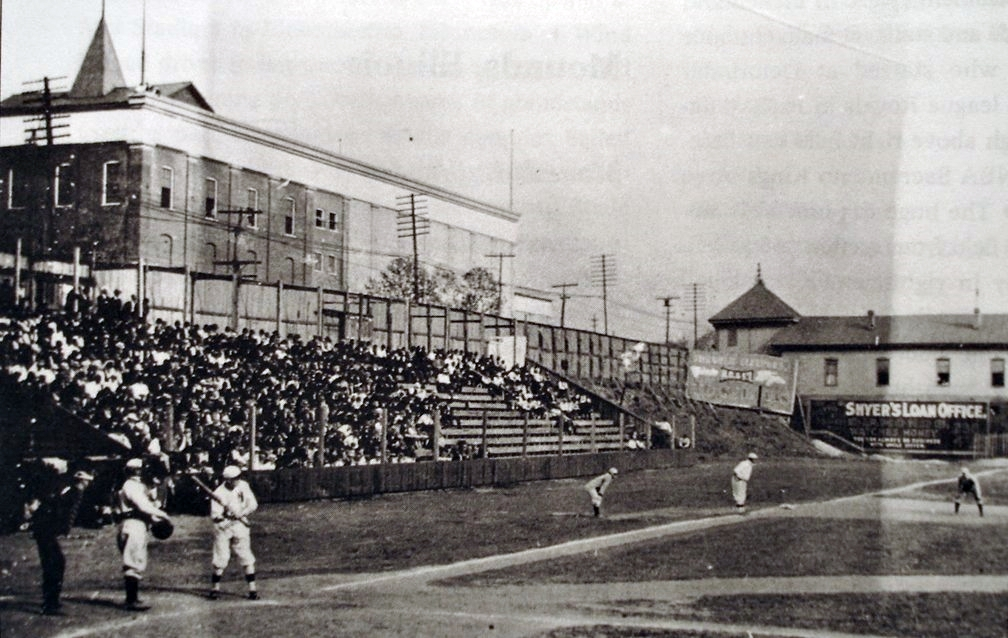
A game at Sulphur Dell, 1908

Team	ATL	BIR	LR	MEM	MOB	MTG	NAS	NO
Atlanta	—	11–8	12–8	9–10	7–12	10–10	6–13	8–11
Birmingham	9–11	—	11–9	7–13	10–9	6–12	9–10	2–18
Little Rock	8–12	9–11	—	10–9	11–9	8–12	9–10	7–13
Memphis	10–9	3–7	9–10	—	12–9	10–9	8–11	11–7
Mobile	12–7	9–10	9–11	9–12	—	11–7	6–12	11–8
Montgomery	10–10	12–6	12–8	9–10	7–11	—	10–9	8–11
Nashville	13–6	10–9	10–9	11–8	12–6	9–10	—	10–8
New Orleans	11–8	18–2	13–7	7–11	8–11	11–8	8–10	—

== Roster ==
Doc Wiseman, "The Hero of the Dell".

Twenty-four players competed for the Vols over the course of the season. Of these, Daubert, Butler, Wiseman, Perdue, and Sitton were named by Nashville Banner sportswriters Fred Russell and George Leonard to an all-time team consisting of top Nashville players from 1901 to 1919.

1908 Nashville Vols
Roster
Pitchers: Bill Bernhard; John Duggan; Win Kellum; Hub Perdue; Carl Sitton; Bill Sorrells; Stan Yerkes	Catchers: Jack Hardy; Ed Hurlburt; Warren Seabough; Infielders: Kid Butler; Jake Daubert; Walter East; John Hess; Henry Jansing; Mike McCormick; Pryor McElveen; Frank Morse	Outfielders: Harry Bay; Al Decker; Jim Duggan; George Hunter; Johnny Siegle; Doc Wiseman	Manager: Bill Bernhard

== Player stats ==
=== Batting ===
==== Starters ====
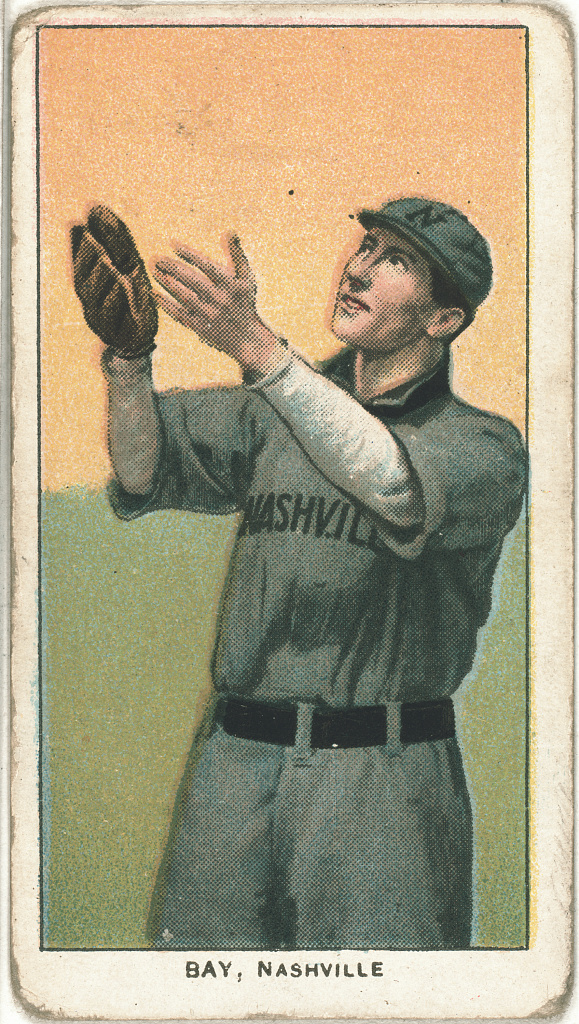
"Deerfoot" Bay was the team's leadoff hitter.

Note: G = Games played; AB = At bats; R = Runs; H = Hits; AVG = Batting average; SLG = Slugging percentage; SB = Stolen bases

Batting order (Note: By August, the team's batting lineup had been settled as follows:)	Pos	Player	G	AB	R	H	AVG	SLG	SB
1	LF	Harry Bay	103	415	45	112	.270	.289	19
7	SS	Kid Butler	136	480	36	127	.265	.321	13
6	1B	Jake Daubert	138	473	49	124	.262	.368	13
3	2B	Walter East							
4	3B	Pryor McElveen	138	514	66	146	.284	.372	15
5	CF	Johnny Siegle	122	428	52	114	.266	.339	16
2	RF	Doc Wiseman	138	525	77	132	.251	.301	30

==== Others ====
Pos	Player	G	AB	R	H	AVG	SLG	SB
CF	Al Decker							
C	Jack Hardy	60	194	22	40	.206	.289	12
C	Ed Hurlburt							
3B	Henry Jansing							
SS	Mike McCormick	48	173	16	45	.260	.283	12
C	Warren Seabough	96	334	16	90	.269	.290	5

==== Pitchers ====
Pos	Player	G	AB	R	H	AVG	SLG	SB
P	Bill Bernhard	15	51	2	10	.196	.216	0
P	John Duggan	33	97	6	17	.175	.186	0
P/IF	John Hess	7	19	0	4	.211	.211	1
P/OF	George Hunter	60	201	33	53	.264	.333	18
P	Win Kellum	26	78	10	14	.179	.218	0
P	Hub Perdue	34	101	8	16	.158	.168	0
P	Carl Sitton	10	33	2	6	.182	.182	0
P	Stan Yerkes	6	12	0	3	.250	.250	0

=== Pitching ===
==== Starting pitchers ====
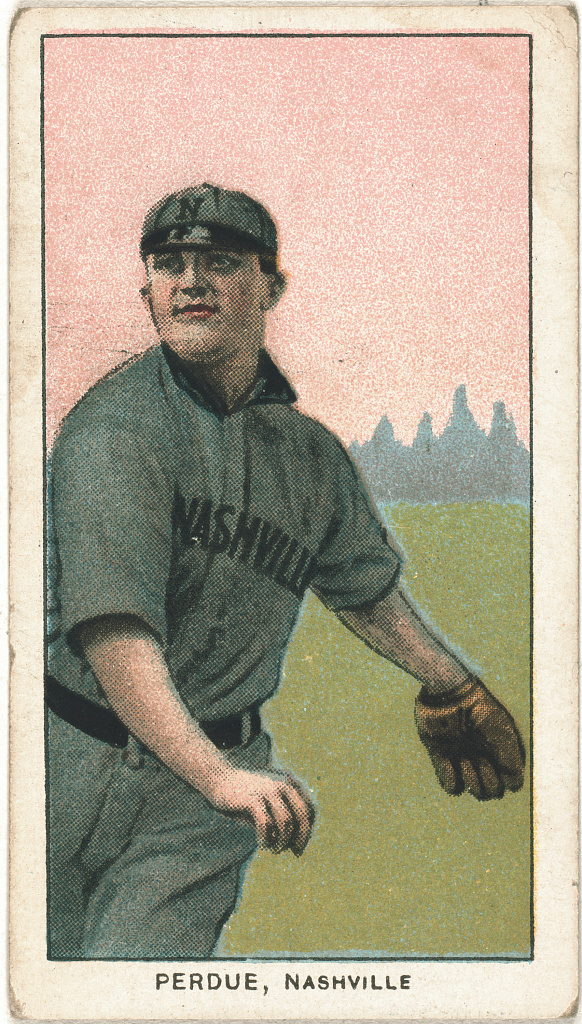
Hub Perdue

Note: G = Games pitched; W = Wins; L = Losses; W% = Winning percentage

Player	G	W	L	W%
John Duggan	34	19	12	.613
Win Kellum	24	15	9	.625
Hub Perdue	32	16	12	.571

==== Other pitchers ====
Player	G	W	L	W%
Bill Bernhard	14	7	6	.538
Jake Daubert	—	—	—	—
John Hess	7	2	5	.286
George Hunter	14	8	5	.615
Carl Sitton	10	6	4	.600
Bill Sorrells	—	—	—	—
Stan Yerkes	6	—	—	—
