= List of Nashville Vols managers =

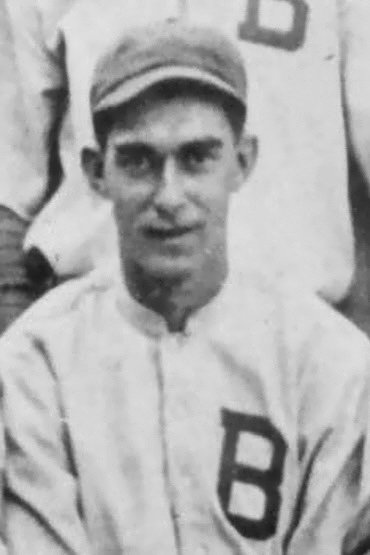
Larry Gilbert led the Vols to win four Southern Association pennants, six playoff championships, and three Dixie Series from 1939 to 1948.

The Nashville Vols were a Minor League Baseball team that played in Nashville, Tennessee, from 1901 to 1963. They were established as charter members of the Southern Association in 1901. Known as the Nashville Baseball Club during their first seven seasons, they became the Nashville Volunteers (regularly shortened to Vols) in 1908. Nashville remained in the Southern Association until it disbanded after the 1961 season. The team sat out the 1962 campaign but returned for a final season in the South Atlantic League in 1963 before ceasing operations altogether. Over 62 seasons, the team was led by 28 managers. Managers are responsible for team strategy and leadership on and off the field, including determining the batting order, arranging defensive positioning, and making tactical decisions regarding pitching changes, pinch-hitting, pinch-running, and defensive replacements. Competing in an era when it was common to have player-managers, 19 men played on teams that they managed.

Nashville's managers led the club for 9,015 regular-season games in which they compiled a win–loss record of 4,569–4,446 (.507). In 16 postseason appearances, their teams had a record of 108–74–1 (.593). They won eight regular-season pennants, nine playoff championships, and four Dixie Series, a best-of-seven playoff series between the champions of the Southern Association and Texas League. Newt Fisher (1901 and 1902), Bill Bernhard (1908), Roy Ellam (1916), and Larry Gilbert (1940, 1943, 1948, and 1949) managed the Vols to win the Southern Association pennant. Gilbert (1939, 1940, 1941, 1942, 1943, and 1944), Rollie Hemsley (1949), Don Osborn (1950), and Hugh Poland (1953) led the team to win Southern Association playoff championships. Gilbert (1940, 1941, and 1942) and Hemsley (1949) managed Nashville to win the Dixie Series. Combining all 9,198 regular-season and postseason games, Nashville's all-time record was 4,677–4,520–1 (.509).

Larry Gilbert won 821 games from 1939 to 1948, placing him first on the all-time wins list for Vols managers. Having managed the team for 1,481 games, 10 full seasons, he was also the longest-tenured manager in team history. The manager with the highest winning percentage over a full season or more was Rollie Hemsley (1949) at .625. Conversely, the lowest winning percentage over a season or more was .342 by manager Mickey Finn (1905–1906).

== History ==
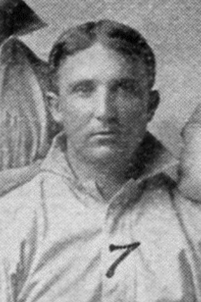
Newt Fisher (1901–1905) managed Nashville to win the first two Southern Association pennants in 1901 and 1902.

The Nashville Baseball Club was created as a charter member of the Southern Association in 1901. The team did not become known as the Nashville Volunteers (regularly shortened to Vols) until 1908. The franchise was operated by Nashville-native Newt Fisher, who was its first manager and played on the team. The Southern Association was a Class B circuit in its inaugural season but was elevated to Class A status in 1902. Under Fisher, the Nashvilles won the first two Southern Association pennants by possessing the best regular-season records in 1901 and 1902. On July 12, 1905, Fisher sold the team to a local stock company. He stayed on as manager until July 17, when former Toledo Mud Hens skipper Mickey Finn was hired to take his place. Finn remained through 1906 in which the club posted its all-time lowest winning percentage of .328 (45–92). His .342 record in two seasons is the lowest among all Nashville managers over a full season or more. John Dobbs, who also played as an outfielder, became Nashville's manager in 1907.

Pitcher Bill Bernhard was hired to manage the Volunteers from 1908 to 1910. He led the club to win a third pennant in his first season. Bill Schwartz, a player-manager at first base, was in charge from 1911 to 1915. Roy Ellam served as manager and shortstop from 1916 to 1920. He guided the Vols to a fourth pennant in 1916. Hub Perdue, who hailed from nearby Bethpage and also pitched, began the 1921 season as manager, but he was dismissed on June 25. The next day, second baseman Chick Knaupp was named as his replacement. Knaupp was then replaced by Larry Doyle, former manager of the Toronto Maple Leafs, on August 20. Doyle continued with the Vols as a player-manager at second base in 1922.

Jimmy Hamilton became manager in 1923. He took the field for one game in 1924. Hamilton stepped down as field manager on July 26, 1928, and made third baseman Tommy Taylor the acting manager while he toured the South scouting players. Taylor remained in the role until being traded to the New Orleans Pelicans on August 3. He was succeeded by Bill Black, who was brought in for the rest of the season and also played second base. Pants Rowland guided the team from 1929 to 1930.

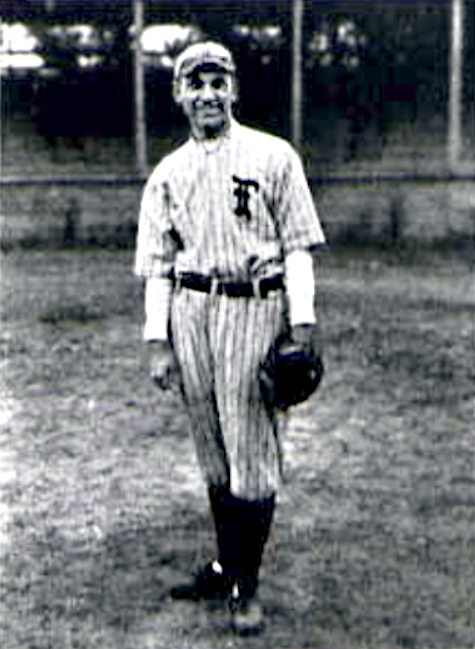
Lance Richbourg managed the Vols over three periods (1934, 1935, and 1936–1937).

Joe Klugmann, who had been with the Vols as a third baseman since 1929, became manager in 1931. He switched to second base in 1931 before moving back to third in 1932. Though Klugmann's 1931 team incurred a franchise-high 102 losses, he was retained for the next season but was ultimately dismissed on July 7, 1932. Chuck Dressen, a third baseman, took over managerial duties the same day. The Vols entered into their first working agreement with a Major League Baseball team in 1934 when they became the Class A farm club of the New York Giants. Dressen remained at the helm until July 28, 1934, when he was hired to manage the Cincinnati Reds. Outfielder Lance Richbourg led Nashville for the rest of the season. The 1935 Vols started the campaign with first baseman Frank Brazill as manager, but he was dismissed on June 5. Richbourg, who had stayed on the roster after his previous managerial tenure, returned to the role in an interim capacity for one game on June 6. Johnny Butler, previously in charge of the Decatur Commodores, was hired as a permanent replacement for the remainder of the season. Nashville began an affiliation with the Cincinnati Reds in 1936 at the same time that the Southern Association was elevated to Class A1 status. Richbourg served as player-manager for a third term from 1936 to 1937.

The Vols became the Class A1 affiliate of the Brooklyn Dodgers in 1938. Dressen returned to lead the team that year. The 1939 season marked the beginning of one of the most successful periods, in terms of winning percentage and championships, in team history under manager Larry Gilbert, who led from 1939 to 1948. Gilbert's Vols won their first of six consecutive Southern Association playoff championships in 1939. They won their fifth regular-season pennant in 1940 with a franchise-high 101–47 (.682) record. After winning a second playoff title, they won their first Dixie Series, a best-of-seven series between the SA champion and Texas League champion to crown a champion of the Southland. The club operated without major league working agreements in 1941 and 1942, but Gilbert led Nashville to win back-to-back playoff championships and Dixie Series in those seasons.

In 1943, the Volunteers became the Class A1 affiliate of the Chicago Cubs. Gilbert's men won two more playoff titles in 1943 and 1944, but the Dixie Series had been suspended due to World War II. In 1946, the Southern Association was reclassified as a Double-A circuit. Nashville won its seventh regular-season flag in 1948. After 10 seasons as manager, Larry Gilbert retired from his post following the season but remained with the team in the role of general manager. Gilbert had led the Vols for 1,471 regular-season games over 10 seasons, making him the longest-tenured manager in team history. He also sits atop the all-time wins list for Vols skippers with 821 wins.

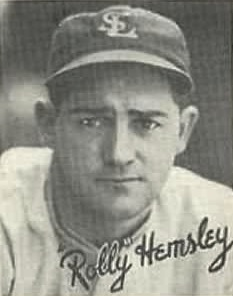
Rollie Hemsley led Nashville to win their fourth and final Dixie Series in 1949.

Rollie Hemsley, Gilbert's successor as well as Vols catcher, managed the 1949 squad to win their eighth league pennant, seventh playoff championship, and fourth and final Dixie Series crown. His .625 winning percentage (95–57) is the highest by any Vols manager over a full season or more. Pitcher Don Osborn led the team to an eighth playoff title in 1950 and continued in a solely managerial capacity in 1951. The Vols returned to the New York Giants organization as their Double-A affiliate from 1952 to 1954. They were managed for the duration of the partnership by Hugh Poland, who previously led New York's Triple-A Ottawa Giants in 1951. The 1953 team won the franchise's ninth and final playoff championship. Nashville repartnered with the Cincinnati Reds, who were known as the Cincinnati Redlegs at the time, from 1955 to 1960. Joe Schultz Jr., manager of Cincinnati's Double-A Tulsa Oilers in 1954, became the Vols' manager in 1955. Ernie White was promoted to the role from their Class A Columbia Reds in 1956. He was followed by first-year manager Dick Sisler from 1957 to 1959. Sisler also played first base in 1957 and 1958. Jim Turner, who was from Antioch, led the Vols in 1960.

Nashville became the Double-A affiliate of the Minnesota Twins in 1961. They were led by Red Robbins, who also played as a third baseman, first baseman, and outfielder, in the only year of the affiliation. Following the season, the Southern Association disbanding after 61 seasons due to the loss of some of its teams and the inability of others to secure major league working agreements for 1962.

The Vols sat out the 1962 campaign, primarily due to the Southern Association's collapse, but returned for a final season in 1963 as the Double-A affiliate of the Los Angeles Angels in the South Atlantic League. They were managed by John Fitzpatrick, who had led the Angels' Class D Quad Cities Angels the previous season. Poor attendance and financial problems resulted in the team's board of directors voting unanimously to surrender the franchise to the league following the season. After 62 seasons in Nashville, the Vols had played 9,015 regular-season games and compiled a win–loss record of 4,569–4,446 (.507). They qualified for postseason playoffs on 16 occasions in which they had a record of 108–74–1 (.593). Combining all 9,198 regular-season and postseason games, Nashville's all-time record was 4,677–4,520–1 (.509).

== Managers ==
Key
No.	A running total of the number of Vols managers. Thus, any manager who has two or more separate terms is only counted once.
G	Games managed
W	Wins
L	Losses
Apps.	Postseason appearances: number of seasons this manager led the team to the postseason
†	Indicates a player-manager

Managers
No.	Manager	Season(s)	Regular-season				Postseason				Composite				Ref(s).
No.	Manager	Season(s)	G	W	L	Win %	Apps.	W	L	Win %	G	W	L	Win %	Ref(s).
1	Newt Fisher^{†} (Note: Newt Fisher stepped down as manager on July 17, 1905, after selling the team on July 12.)	1901–1905	574	313	261	.545	—	—	—	—	574	313	261	.545	
2	Mickey Finn (Note: Mickey Finn became manager on July 17, 1905.)	1905–1906	202	69	133	.342	—	—	—	—	202	69	133	.342	
3	John Dobbs^{†}	1907	137	59	78	.431	—	—	—	—	137	59	78	.431	
4	Bill Bernhard^{†}	1908–1910	408	221	187	.542	—	—	—	—	408	221	187	.542	
5	Bill Schwartz^{†}	1911–1915	710	350	360	.493	—	—	—	—	710	350	360	.493	
6	Roy Ellam^{†}	1916–1920	650	311	339	.478	—	—	—	—	650	311	339	.478	
7	Hub Perdue^{†} (Note: Hub Perdue was dismissed on June 25, 1921.)	1921	71	29	42	.408	—	—	—	—	71	29	42	.408	
8	Chick Knaupp^{†} (Note: Chick Knaupp became manager on June 26, 1921, and was replaced on August 20.)	1921	50	18	32	.360	—	—	—	—	50	18	32	.360	
9	Larry Doyle^{†} (Note: Larry Doyle became manager on August 20, 1921.)	1921–1922	183	71	112	.388	—	—	—	—	183	71	112	.388	
10	Jimmy Hamilton^{†} (Note: Jimmy Hamilton stepped down as field manager on July 26, 1928.)	1923–1928	863	443	420	.513	—	—	—	—	863	443	420	.513	
11	Tommy Taylor^{†} (Note: Tommy Taylor was the acting manager from July 26 to August 3, 1928, upon being traded to the New Orleans Pelicans.)	1928	8	2	6	.250	—	—	—	—	8	2	6	.250	
12	Bill Black^{†} (Note: Bill Black was made acting manager on August 3, 1928.)	1928	44	15	29	.341	—	—	—	—	44	15	29	.341	
13	Pants Rowland	1929–1930	306	156	150	.510	—	—	—	—	306	156	150	.510	
14	Joe Klugmann^{†} (Note: Joe Klugmann was dismissed on July 7, 1932.)	1931–1932	229	87	142	.380	—	—	—	—	229	87	142	.380	
15	Chuck Dressen^{†} (Note: Chuck Dressen became manager on July 7, 1932. He left after being hired to manage the Cincinnati Reds on July 28, 1934.)	1932–1934	321	177	144	.551	—	—	—	—	321	177	144	.551	
16	Lance Richbourg^{†} (Note: Lance Richbourg became manager on July 28, 1934.)	1934	54	26	28	.481	1	2	3	.400	59	28	31	.475	
17	Frank Brazill^{†} (Note: Frank Brazill was dismissed on June 5, 1935.)	1935	49	24	25	.490	—	—	—	—	49	24	25	.490	
—	Lance Richbourg^{†} (Note: Lance Richbourg served in an interim capacity for one game on June 6, 1935.)	1935	1	1	0	1.000	—	—	—	—	1	1	0	1.000	
18	Johnny Butler (Note: Johnny Butler became manager on June 7, 1935.)	1935	101	57	44	.564	1	0	3	.000	105 (Note: An additional 1935 postseason game ended in a tie.)	57	47	.548	
—	Lance Richbourg^{†}	1936–1937	304	166	138	.546	1	2	3	.400	309	168	141	.544	
—	Chuck Dressen	1938	150	84	66	.560	1	4	6	.400	160	88	72	.550	
19	Larry Gilbert	1939–1948	1,481	821	660	.554	8	63	33	.656	1,577	884	693	.561	
20	Rollie Hemsley^{†}	1949	152	95	57	.625	1	12	7	.632	171	107	64	.626	
21	Don Osborn^{†}	1950–1951	304	164	140	.539	1	11	6	.647	321	175	146	.545	
22	Hugh Poland	1952–1954	460	222	238	.483	1	10	7	.588	477	232	245	.486	
23	Joe Schultz Jr.	1955	151	77	74	.510	—	—	—	—	151	77	74	.510	
24	Ernie White	1956	154	75	79	.487	—	—	—	—	154	75	79	.487	
25	Dick Sisler^{†}	1957–1959	454	243	211	.535	1	4	6	.400	464	247	217	.532	
26	Jim Turner	1960	153	71	82	.464	—	—	—	—	153	71	82	.464	
27	Red Robbins^{†}	1961	152	69	83	.454	—	—	—	—	152	69	83	.454	
28	John Fitzpatrick	1963	139	53	86	.381	—	—	—	—	139	53	86	.381	
Totals	28 managers	62 seasons	9,015	4,569	4,446	.507	16	108	74	.593	9,198	4,677	4,520	.509	—

Managers with multiple tenures
No.	Manager	Season(s)	Regular-season				Postseason				Composite				Ref(s).
No.	Manager	Season(s)	G	W	L	Win %	Apps.	W	L	Win %	G	W	L	Win %	Ref(s).
15	Chuck Dressen^{†}	1932–1934, 1938	471	261	210	.554	1	4	6	.400	481	265	216	.551	
16	Lance Richbourg^{†}	1934, 1935, 1936–1937	359	193	166	.538	2	4	6	.400	369	197	172	.534	
