= List of Nashville Vols seasons =

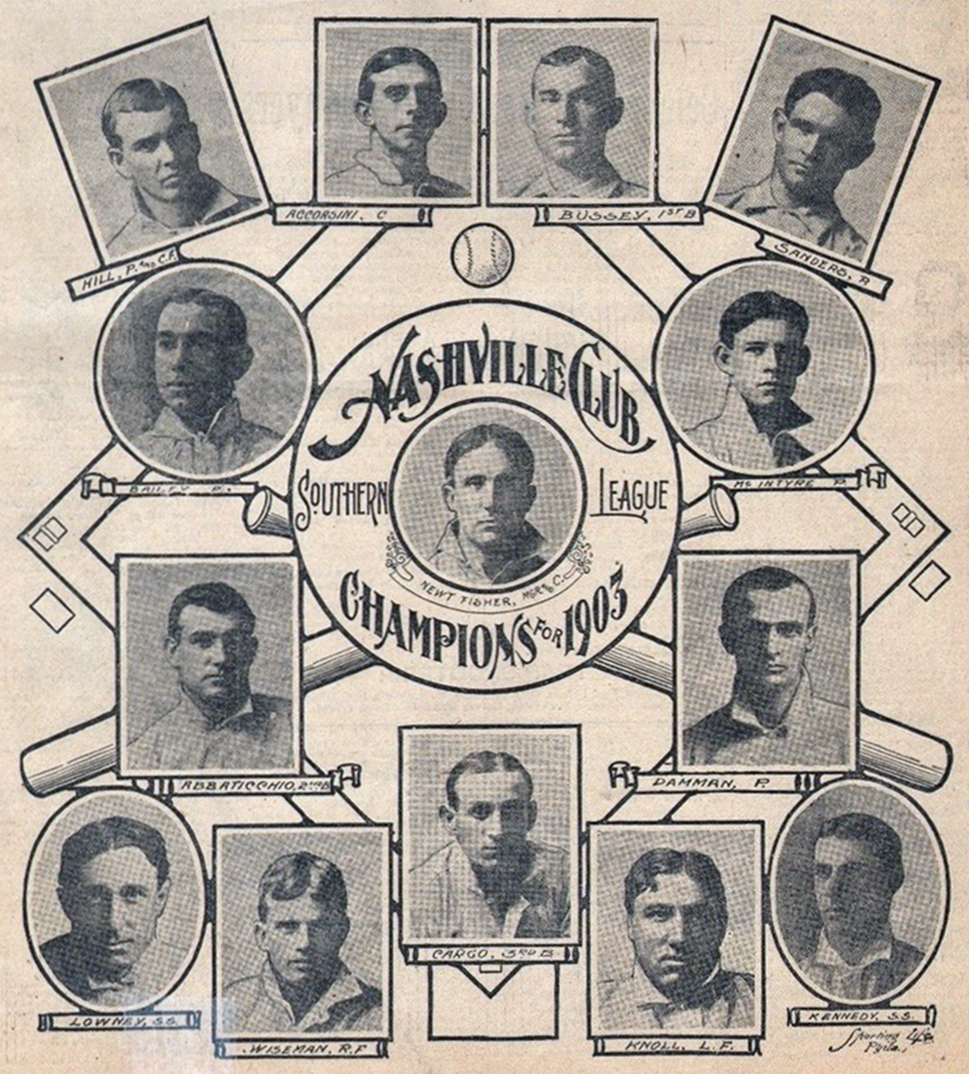
The 1902 Nashville Baseball Club, champions of the Southern Association

The Nashville Vols were a Minor League Baseball team that played in Nashville, Tennessee, from 1901 to 1963. They were established as charter members of the Southern Association (SA) in 1901. Known as the Nashville Baseball Club during their first seven seasons, they became the Nashville Volunteers (regularly shortened to Vols) in 1908. Nashville remained in the Southern Association until the circuit disbanded after the 1961 season. The team sat out the 1962 campaign but returned for a final season in the South Atlantic League (SAL) in 1963 before ceasing operations altogether. Over 62 seasons, the Vols played 9,015 regular-season games and compiled a win–loss record of 4,569–4,446 (.507). They qualified for postseason playoffs on 16 occasions in which they had a record of 108–74–1 (.593). Combining all 9,198 regular-season and postseason games, Nashville's all-time record was 4,677–4,520–1 (.509).

The Southern Association, of which the Volunteers were members for the entirety of its 61-season run, operated at the Class B (1901), Class A (1902–1935), Class A1 (1936–1945), and Double-A (1946–1961) levels of the minors. The South Atlantic League was at the Double-A level during Nashville's only year of membership. In 35 seasons, the Vols were not affiliated with any Major League Baseball team. Across 27 seasons, they served as a farm club for six major league franchises: the New York Giants (1934–1935, 1952–1954), Cincinnati Reds (1936–1937, 1955–1960), Brooklyn Dodgers (1938–1940), Chicago Cubs (1943–1951), Minnesota Twins (1961), and Los Angeles Angels (1963). The Vols typically owned the majority of their players, and these major league clubs furnished Nashville with additional players to round out the roster.

Throughout the Southern Association's existence, the team with the best regular-season record was recognized as the pennant winner. Nashville won eight SA pennants. In some seasons, the circuit utilized a split-season schedule wherein the winners from each half qualified for postseason championship playoffs. In others, the loop used the Shaughnessy playoff system in which the top four teams at the end of the season participated in a tournament to determine a champion. The Vols qualified for the playoffs on 16 occasions and won nine SA playoff championships. From 1920 to 1958, the league's champions met those of the Texas League in the Dixie Series to crown a champion of the Southland. Nashville played in seven Dixie Series, winning four. The South Atlantic League used a split-season format, but the Vols did not qualify in their only season as members.

The team's best season record occurred in 1940 when they finished 101–47 (.682) while having a working agreement with the Brooklyn Dodgers. Their lowest season record was 45–92 (.328) in 1906 as an unaffiliated club. Of the six Major League Baseball teams with which Nashville was affiliated, the Vols experienced their best record with the Dodgers from 1938 to 1940. They had a composite season record of 270–181 (.599) and reached the postseason in all three years, winning one pennant, two playoff championships, and one Dixie Series. Including a postseason mark of 25–16 (.610), their overall record was 295–197 (.600). Conversely, the team's lowest record was with the Los Angeles Angels in 1963. The Vols incurred a 53–86 (.381) record and did not reach the postseason during the partnership. Over the 35 seasons in which they had no major league affiliation, Nashville went 2,428–2,534 (.489) in the regular-season and won four pennants, two playoff titles, and two Dixie Series. Adding in a postseason record of a 22–7 (.759) in two appearances, Nashville was 2,450–2,541 (.491) as an unaffiliated team.

== History ==
=== Southern Association (1901–1961) ===
==== Pre-playoff era (1901–1932) ====
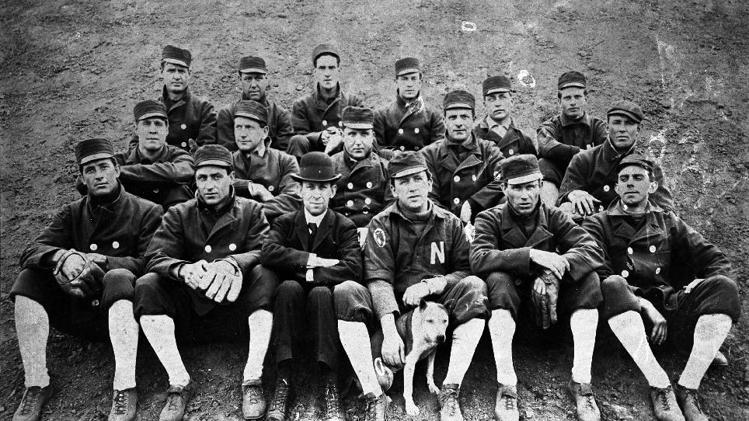
The 1901 Nashville Baseball Club won the first Southern Association pennant.

The Nashville Baseball Club was created as a charter member of the Southern Association (SA) in 1901. The team did not become known as the Nashville Volunteers (regularly shortened to Vols) until 1908. The Southern Association was a Class B circuit in its inaugural season but was elevated to Class A status in 1902.

Through 1932, seasons concluded with the team in possession of the best regular-season record being recognized as the pennant winner. Nashville won the first Southern Association pennant in 1901 by finishing one game ahead of the second-place Little Rock Travelers with a league-best 78–45 (.634) win–loss record. They captured the 1902 pennant as well, finishing six games ahead of the New Orleans Pelicans atop the league standings at 80–40 (.667). Despite this early success, the Nashvilles posted their all-time lowest winning percentage in 1906, when they went 45–92 (.328). Two years later, in 1908, the newly-named Volunteers won their third pennant with a 75–56 (.573) mark by .002 percentage points ahead of New Orleans. The Vols won their fourth and final pre-playoff title in 1916 by coming in nine games ahead of New Orleans at 84–54 (.609). During this era, the 1931 team incurred a franchise-high 102 losses.

==== Playoff era (1933–1961) ====
The Vols entered into their first working agreement with a Major League Baseball team in 1934 when they became the Class A farm club of the New York Giants. The Southern Association had begun staging annual postseason championship playoffs in 1933 using a split-season schedule wherein the winners from each half competed for the championship, though the league continued to also recognize regular-season pennant winners. Nashville first qualified for the postseason by winning the first-half of the 1934 season, but they lost the Southern Association playoff championship in a series versus New Orleans, winners of the second-half. In 1935, the circuit adopted the Shaughnessy playoff system in which the top four teams at the end of the season participated in a tournament to determine a champion. The Vols qualified via a fourth-place finish but were eliminated in the opening semi-final round by the Atlanta Crackers. The affiliation with New York ended after the season.

Nashville began an affiliation with the Cincinnati Reds in 1936 at the same time that the Southern Association was elevated to Class A1 status. The second-place Vols made the 1936 playoffs but were defeated in the semifinals by the Birmingham Barons. Their working agreement with Cincinnati ended after the 1937 season in which the team did not reach the playoffs.

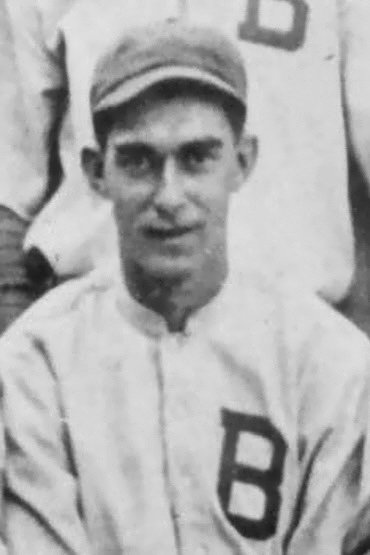
Larry Gilbert led the Vols to win four Southern Association pennants, six playoff championships, and three Dixie Series from 1939 to 1948.

The Vols became the Class A1 affiliate of the Brooklyn Dodgers in 1938. As the league runner-up, the 1938 team advanced past New Orleans in the semifinals but was defeated by Atlanta in the championship round. The next season marked the beginning of one of the most successful periods, in terms of winning percentage and championships, in team history under manager Larry Gilbert, who led the Vols from 1939 to 1948. The third-place 1939 Vols beat the Memphis Chicks in the opening round before winning their first playoff championship against Atlanta. This was the first of six consecutive playoff titles for the Volunteers. Since 1920, the champions of the Southern Association had been meeting the champions of the Texas League in the Dixie Series, a best-of-seven series to crown a champion of the Southland. In their first Dixie appearance, Nashville lost to the Texas League champion Fort Worth Cats. The Vols won their fifth regular-season pennant in 1940 with a franchise-high 101–47 (.682) record, nine-and-a-half games ahead of Atlanta. They beat the Chattanooga Lookouts in the semifinals before winning a second playoff title versus Atlanta. Nashville then defeated the Houston Buffaloes for their first Dixie Series title. In a 2001 ranking, the 1940 Vols were evaluated as the 47th greatest minor league team of all time. Of the six major league teams with which Nashville was affiliated, the Volunteers experienced their best record with the Dodgers from 1938 to 1940. They were 270–181 (.599) in the regular-season and 25–16 (.610) in postseason play, giving them a composite record of 295–197 (.600).

The club operated without major league working agreements in 1941 and 1942. In the 1941 playoffs, the second-place Vols defeated New Orleans on the way to winning their third playoff championship over Atlanta. The season was capped with a second-straight Dixie Series victory over the Dallas Rebels. The 1942 team, which had placed second, downed Birmingham in the semifinals and won a fourth playoff title against Little Rock. Facing the Shreveport Sports, Nashville won a third consecutive Dixie Series title.

In 1943, the Volunteers became the Class A1 affiliate of the Chicago Cubs. With a split-season schedule in place, they won the first-half of the season and later clinched their sixth regular-season pennant with a league-best 83–55 (.601) record, four games ahead of New Orleans. In an abbreviated postseason, Nashville won their fifth consecutive playoff title over New Orleans, winners of the second-half. The Dixie Series was suspended due to World War II. The 1944 Vols won the second-half title on way to capturing their sixth consecutive playoff championship by defeating first-half pennant winners Memphis. The Dixie Series was still on wartime hiatus. In 1946, the Southern Association was reclassified as a Double-A circuit. Nashville next qualified for the playoffs in 1947 with a third-place finish and moved past the semifinals versus New Orleans but were defeated for the league title by the Mobile Bears. Nashville won a seventh regular-season flag in 1948 at 95–58 (.621), besting Memphis by three games. Similar to the previous campaign, they reached the finals with a semifinal win over Mobile but lost the championship to Birmingham. The 1949 squad won their eighth league pennant by four-and-a-half games over Birmingham with a 95–57 (.625) season. Nashville advanced past New Orleans in the semifinals and then won their seventh playoff championship versus Mobile. They followed up with a Dixie Series victory over the Tulsa Oilers. Placing third in 1950, the Vols won their semifinal bout over Birmingham and then beat Atlanta to win an eighth playoff title. They lost the Dixie Series, however, to the San Antonio Missions. The Chicago affiliation was discontinued after the 1951 season, in which Nashville missed the postseason for the first time in five years.

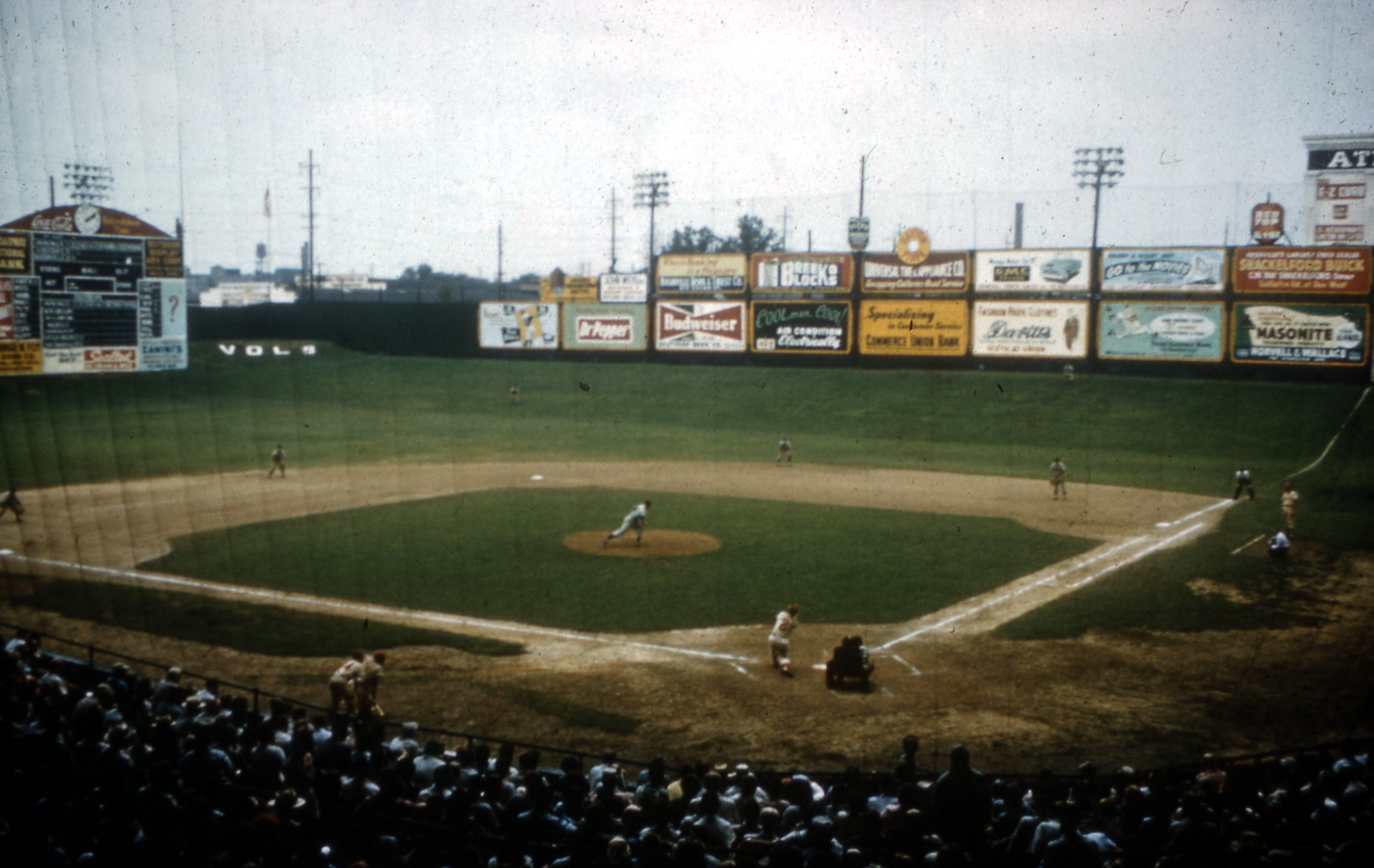
A game at Sulphur Dell, Nashville's home ballpark (c. 1950s–1960s)

The Vols returned to the New York Giants organization as their Double-A affiliate from 1952 to 1954. While the 1952 and 1954 teams posted losing records, the 1953 club finished second, defeated Atlanta in the semifinals, and won Nashville's ninth and final Southern Association championship over Birmingham. In their last of seven Dixie Series appearances, they were defeated by the Dallas Eagles.

Nashville repartnered with the Cincinnati Reds, who were known as the Cincinnati Redlegs at the time, from 1955 to 1960. Through the six-year partnership, the Vols had an equal number of winning and losing seasons, never finishing higher than third. That was in 1957 when the Vols made their final playoff appearance. After eliminating Memphis, they were beaten by Atlanta.

The Volunteers became the Double-A affiliate of the Minnesota Twins in 1961. They finished well-behind pennant-winning Chattanooga. Following the campaign, the Southern Association disbanding after 61 seasons due to the loss of some of its teams and the inability of others to secure major league working agreements for 1962.

=== South Atlantic League (1963) ===
The Vols sat out the 1962 campaign, primarily due to the Southern Association's collapse, but returned for a final season in 1963 as the Double-A affiliate of the Los Angeles Angels in the South Atlantic League. The Vols placed last out of eight teams at 53–86 (.381), a franchise-low among all affiliations, and did not with either half of the Sally League's split-season.

Poor attendance and financial problems resulted in the team's board of directors voting unanimously to surrender the franchise to the league following the season. After 62 seasons in Nashville, the Vols had played 9,015 regular-season games and compiled a win–loss record of 4,569–4,446 (.507). They qualified for postseason playoffs on 16 occasions in which they had a record of 108–74–1 (.593). Combining all 9,198 regular-season and postseason games, Nashville's all-time record was 4,677–4,520–1 (.509).

== Season-by-season records ==
Key
Season	Some years are linked to articles about that Nashville season.
GB	Games behind the team that finished in first place that season
‡	Dixie Series champions (1920–1958)
†	Playoff champions (1903, 1928–1960, 1963)
*	Pennant winners (1901–1961, 1963)
^	Postseason berth (1903, 1928–1960, 1963)

Season-by-season records
Season	League	Regular-season				Postseason			MLB affiliate	Ref.
Season	League	Record	Win %	Finish	GB	Record	Win %	Result	MLB affiliate	Ref.
1901 *	SA	78–45	.634	1st	—	—	—	Won SA pennant	Unaffiliated	
1902 *	SA	80–40	.667	1st	—	—	—	Won SA pennant	Unaffiliated	
1903	SA	60–62	.492	5th	11 1/2	—	—	—	Unaffiliated	
1904	SA	72–67	.518	5th	11	—	—	—	Unaffiliated	
1905	SA	47–88	.348	7th	40	—	—	—	Unaffiliated	
1906	SA	45–92	.328	7th	43 1/2	—	—	—	Unaffiliated	
1907	SA	59–78	.431	8th	21 1/2	—	—	—	Unaffiliated	
1908 *	SA	75–56	.573	1st	—	—	—	Won SA pennant	Unaffiliated	
1909	SA	82–55	.599	2nd	5 1/2	—	—	—	Unaffiliated	
1910	SA	64–76	.457	5th	23	—	—	—	Unaffiliated	
1911	SA	69–64	.519	4th	9 1/2	—	—	—	Unaffiliated	
1912	SA	67–70	.489	5th	18 1/2	—	—	—	Unaffiliated	
1913	SA	62–76	.449	7th	19 1/2	—	—	—	Unaffiliated	
1914	SA	77–72	.517	5th	10	—	—	—	Unaffiliated	
1915	SA	75–78	.490	4th	15 1/2	—	—	—	Unaffiliated	
1916 *	SA	84–54	.609	1st	—	—	—	Won SA pennant	Unaffiliated	
1917	SA	77–73	.513	5th	19	—	—	—	Unaffiliated	
1918 (Note: The 1918 season was suspended after the games of June 28 as team owners voted to end the season early due to poor attendance, increased transportation costs, and in response to the country's "work or fight" order to aid the effort to win World War I.)	SA	30–40	.429	7th	19	—	—	—	Unaffiliated	
1919	SA	55–83	.399	8th	30	—	—	—	Unaffiliated	
1920	SA	65–89	.422	7th	26 1/2	—	—	—	Unaffiliated	
1921	SA	62–90	.408	6th	41 1/2	—	—	—	Unaffiliated	
1922	SA	56–96	.368	7th	41	—	—	—	Unaffiliated	
1923	SA	75–77	.493	6th	17	—	—	—	Unaffiliated	
1924	SA	78–75	.510	4th	26	—	—	—	Unaffiliated	
1925	SA	81–72	.529	3rd	5 1/2	—	—	—	Unaffiliated	
1926	SA	83–68	.550	4th	16 1/2	—	—	—	Unaffiliated	
1927	SA	84–69	.549	4th	12	—	—	—	Unaffiliated	
1928	SA	59–94	.386	8th	40	—	—	—	Unaffiliated	
1929	SA	90–63	.588	2nd	3	—	—	—	Unaffiliated	
1930	SA	66–87	.431	7th	32	—	—	—	Unaffiliated	
1931	SA	51–102	.333	8th	46 1/2	—	—	—	Unaffiliated	
1932	SA	75–78	.490	4th	25 1/2	—	—	—	Unaffiliated	
1933	SA	77–69	.527	3rd	14 1/2	—	—	—	Unaffiliated	
1934^	SA	87–65	.572	2nd	6	2–3	.400	Won first-half title Lost SA championship vs. New Orleans Pelicans, 3–2	New York Giants	
1935^	SA	82–69	.543	4th	9	0–3–1	.000	Lost semifinals vs. Atlanta Crackers, 3–0–1	New York Giants	
1936^	SA	86–65	.570	2nd	7	2–3	.400	Lost semifinals vs. Birmingham Barons, 3–2	Cincinnati Reds	
1937	SA	80–73	.523	5th	17 1/2	—	—	—	Cincinnati Reds	
1938^	SA	84–66	.560	2nd	5 1/2	4–6	.400	Won semifinals vs. New Orleans Pelicans, 3–2; Lost SA championship vs. Atlanta Crackers, 4–1	Brooklyn Dodgers	
1939^ †	SA	85–68	.556	3rd	1 1/2	10–7	.588	Won semifinals vs. Memphis Chicks, 3–0; Won SA championship vs. Atlanta Crackers, 4–3; Lost Dixie Series vs. Fort Worth Cats, 4–3	Brooklyn Dodgers	
1940^ * † ‡	SA	101–47	.682	1st	—	11–3	.786	Won SA pennant Won semifinals vs. Chattanooga Lookouts, 3–0; Won SA championship vs. Atlanta Crackers, 4–2; Won Dixie Series vs. Houston Buffaloes, 4–1	Brooklyn Dodgers	
1941^ † ‡	SA	83–70	.542	2nd	15 1/2	11–4	.733	Won semifinals vs. New Orleans Pelicans, 3–1; Won SA championship vs. Atlanta Crackers, 4–3; Won Dixie Series vs. Dallas Rebels, 4–0	Unaffiliated	
1942^ † ‡	SA	85–66	.563	2nd	4 1/2	11–3	.786	Won semifinals vs. Birmingham Barons, 3–1; Won SA championship vs. Little Rock Travelers, 4–0; Won Dixie Series vs. Shreveport Sports, 4–2	Unaffiliated	
1943^ * †	SA	83–55	.601	1st	—	4–1	.800	Won first-half title Won SA pennant Won SA championship vs. New Orleans Pelicans, 4–1	Chicago Cubs	
1944^ †	SA	79–61	.564	3rd	7 1/2	4–3	.571	Won second-half title Won SA championship vs. Memphis Chicks, 4–3	Chicago Cubs	
1945	SA	55–84	.396	7th	38 1/2	—	—	—	Chicago Cubs	
1946	SA	75–78	.490	5th (tie)	20 1/2	—	—	—	Chicago Cubs	
1947^	SA	80–73	.523	3rd	14	6–5	.545	Won semifinals vs. New Orleans Pelicans, 4–1; Lost SA championship vs. Mobile Bears, 4–2	Chicago Cubs	
1948^ *	SA	95–58	.621	1st	—	6–7	.462	Won SA pennant Won semifinals vs. Mobile Bears, 4–3; Lost SA championship vs. Birmingham Barons, 4–2	Chicago Cubs	
1949^ * † ‡	SA	95–57	.625	1st	—	12–7	.632	Won SA pennant Won semifinals vs. New Orleans Pelicans, 4–2; Won SA championship vs. Mobile Bears, 4–2; Won Dixie Series vs. Tulsa Oilers, 4–3	Chicago Cubs	
1950^ †	SA	86–64	.573	3rd	5 1/2	11–6	.647	Won semifinals vs. Birmingham Barons, 4–1; Won SA championship vs. Atlanta Crackers, 4–1; Lost Dixie Series vs. San Antonio Missions, 4–3	Chicago Cubs	
1951	SA	78–76	.506	5th	15 1/2	—	—	—	Chicago Cubs	
1952	SA	73–79	.480	6th	13	—	—	—	New York Giants	
1953^ †	SA	85–69	.552	2nd	2	10–7	.588	Won semifinals vs. Atlanta Crackers, 4–2; Won SA championship vs. Birmingham Barons, 4–1; Lost Dixie Series vs. Dallas Eagles, 4–2	New York Giants	
1954	SA	64–90	.416	6th (tie)	30	—	—	—	New York Giants	
1955	SA	77–74	.510	5th	12	—	—	—	Cincinnati Redlegs	
1956	SA	75–79	.487	7th	14	—	—	—	Cincinnati Redlegs	
1957^	SA	83–69	.546	3rd	3	4–6	.400	Won semifinals vs. Memphis Chicks, 4–2; Lost SA championship vs. Atlanta Crackers, 4–0	Cincinnati Redlegs	
1958	SA	76–78	.494	5th	15 1/2	—	—	—	Cincinnati Redlegs	
1959	SA	84–64	.568	3rd	5 1/2	—	—	—	Cincinnati Redlegs	
1960	SA	71–82	.464	6th	15 1/2	—	—	—	Cincinnati Reds	
1961	SA	69–83	.454	6th	21	—	—	—	Minnesota Twins	
1963	SAL	53–86	.381	8th	27 1/2	—	—	—	Los Angeles Angels	
Totals	—	4,569–4,446	.507	—	—	108–74–1	.593	–	—	—

=== Split-season records ===
The Southern Association sporadically used a split-season schedule wherein the winners from each half qualified for postseason championship playoffs. The South Atlantic League utilized the same format in the Vols' only season of membership.

Split-season records
Season	League	Half	Regular-season				Postseason			MLB affiliate	Ref.
Season	League	Half	Record	Win %	Finish	GB	Record	Win %	Result	MLB affiliate	Ref.
1928	SA	1st	31–42	.425	6th	17 1/2	—	—	Result	—	Unaffiliated
1928	SA	2nd	28–52	.350	8th	25 1/2	—	—		—	Unaffiliated
1933	SA	1st	39–37	.513	5th	10 1/2	—	—	—	New York Giants	
1933	SA	2nd	38–32	.543	3rd	5	—	—	—	New York Giants	
1934^	SA	1st	46–26	.639	1st	—	2–3	.400	Won first-half title Lost SA championship vs. New Orleans Pelicans, 3–2	New York Giants	
1934^	SA	2nd	41–39	.513	4th	12	2–3	.400	Won first-half title Lost SA championship vs. New Orleans Pelicans, 3–2	New York Giants	
1943^ * †	SA	1st	49–26	.653	1st	—	4–1	.800	Won first-half title Won SA pennant Won SA championship vs. New Orleans Pelicans, 4–1	Chicago Cubs	
1943^ * †	SA	2nd	34–29	.540	3rd	6 1/2	4–1	.800	Won first-half title Won SA pennant Won SA championship vs. New Orleans Pelicans, 4–1	Chicago Cubs	
1944 6 †	SA	1st	32–36	.471	5th	9 1/2	4–3	.571	Won second-half title Won SA championship vs. Memphis Chicks, 4–3	Chicago Cubs	
1944 6 †	SA	2nd	47–25	.653	1st	—	4–3	.571	Won second-half title Won SA championship vs. Memphis Chicks, 4–3	Chicago Cubs	
1959	SA	1st	41–24	.631	2nd	1/2	—	—	—	Cincinnati Redlegs	
1959	SA	2nd	43–40	.518	5th	12	—	—	—	Cincinnati Redlegs	
1963	SAL	1st	24–47	.338	8th	21 1/2	—	—	—	Los Angeles Angels	
1963	SAL	2nd	29–39	.426	6th	16 1/2	—	—	—	Los Angeles Angels	

== Franchise totals ==
=== By classification ===
Franchise totals by classification
Classification	Regular-season		Postseason			Composite	
Classification	Record	Win %	Appearances	Record	Win %	Record	Win %
Class B (1901)	78–45	.634	0	—	—	78–45	.634
Class A (1902–1935)	2,351–2,487	.486	2	2–6–1	.250	2,353–2,493–1	.486
Class A1 (1936–1945)	821–655	.556	8	57–30	.655	878–685	.562
Double-A (1946–1961, 1963)	1,319–1,259	.512	6	49–38	.563	1,368–1,297	.513
All-time	4,569–4,446	.507	16	108–74–1	.593	4,677–4,520–1	.509

=== By league ===
Franchise totals by league
League	Regular-season		Postseason			Composite	
League	Record	Win %	Appearances	Record	Win %	Record	Win %
Southern Association (1901–1961)	4,516–4,360	.509	16	108–74–1	.593	4,624–4,434–1	.510
South Atlantic League (1963)	53–86	.381	0	—	—	53–86	.381
All-time	4,569–4,446	.507	16	108–74–1	.593	4,677–4,520–1	.509

=== By affiliation ===
Franchise totals by affiliation
Affiliation	Regular-season		Postseason			Composite	
Affiliation	Record	Win %	Appearances	Record	Win %	Record	Win %
New York Giants (1934–1935, 1952–1954)	391–372	.512	3	12–13–1	.480	403–385–1	.511
Cincinnati Reds/Redlegs (1936–1937, 1955–1960)	632–584	.520	2	6–9	.400	638–593	.518
Brooklyn Dodgers (1938–1940)	270–181	.599	3	25–16	.610	295–197	.600
Chicago Cubs (1943–1951)	726–606	.545	6	43–29	.597	769–635	.548
Minnesota Twins (1961)	69–83	.454	0	—	—	69–83	.454
Los Angeles Angels (1963)	53–86	.381	0	—	—	53–86	.381
Unaffiliated (1901–1908, 1909–1933, 1941–1942)	2,428–2,534	.489	2	22–7	.759	2,450–2,541	.491
All-time	4,569–4,446	.507	16	108–74–1	.593	4,677–4,520–1	.509
