= 1908 Nashville vs. New Orleans baseball game =

1908 Southern Association championship game

1908 Nashville–New Orleans Southern Association championship game
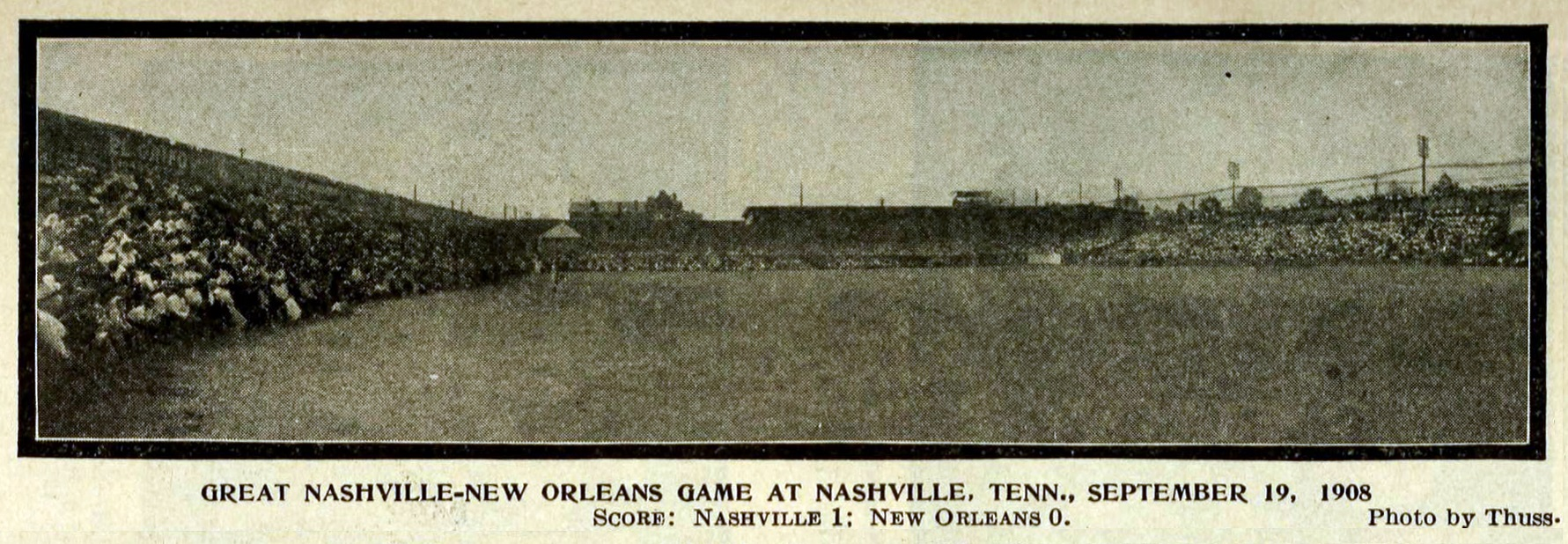
- A panorama of the field that day
	1	2	3	4	5	6	7	8	9	R	H	E
New Orleans Pelicans	0	0	0	0	0	0	0	0	0	0	4	1
Nashville Vols	0	0	0	0	0	0	1	0	X	1	8	0
- Date: September 19, 1908
- Venue: Sulphur Dell
- City: Nashville, Tennessee
- Managers: Charlie Frank (New Orleans Pelicans); Bill Bernhard (Nashville Vols)
- Umpires: Carpenter; Fitzsimmons
- Attendance: 10,700

The 1908 Nashville vs. New Orleans baseball game dubbed by Grantland Rice "The Greatest Game Ever Played in Dixie" was a 1–0 pitching duel to decide the Southern Association championship in the dead-ball era, on the last day of the season. The Nashville Vols won the game and thus the pennant by .002 percentage points, after finishing the prior season in last place. Both teams had the same number of losses (56), but the New Orleans Pelicans were in first place with 76 wins to the Vols' second-place 74. Carl Sitton used his spitball to out-pitch Ted Breitenstein for a complete-game, nine-strikeout, four-hit, shutout. According to one account, "By one run, by one point, Nashville has won the Southern League pennant, nosing New Orleans out literally by an eyelash. Saturday's game, which was the deciding one, between Nashville and New Orleans was the greatest exhibition of the national game ever seen in the south and the finish in the league race probably sets a record in baseball history".

Nashville scored in the seventh inning with the bases loaded. With two outs, catcher Ed Hurlburt hit a single. Then Sitton did too. Harry "Deerfoot" Bay bunted perfectly down the third base line, Bay's fondest memory in his long baseball career. Julius Augustus "Doc" Wiseman then drove in the winning run. Sitton was thrown out at home after Hurlburt scored. The time of the game was one hour and forty-two minutes.

== Box score ==
Pelicans	AB	R	H	PO	A	E
Roy Montgomery, RF	4	0	0	1	0	0
George Rohe, 3B	4	0	0	0	4	0
Bris Lord, CF	4	0	0	0	1	0
Bob Tarleton, 1B	4	0	2	12	2	0
Charles Dexter, SS	3	0	1	3	3	1
Joe Rickert, LF	3	0	1	1	0	0
Gus Dundon, 2B	3	0	0	2	2	0
Harry Matthews, C	3	0	0	4	0	0
Ted Breitenstein, P	1	0	0	1	3	0

Pelicans	IP	H	R	BB	SO	HR
Ted Breitenstein, L	8.0	8	1	1	3	0

Vols	AB	R	H	PO	A	E
Harry Bay, LF	4	0	1	0	0	0
Doc Wiseman, RF	3	0	2	1	0	0
Walter East, 2B	4	0	1	1	3	0
Pryor McElveen, 3B	3	0	1	3	1	0
Johnny Siegle, CF	4	0	0	1	0	0
Jake Daubert, 1B	4	0	1	10	1	0
Kid Butler, SS	3	0	0	1	3	0
Ed Hurlburt, C	3	1	1	9	0	0
Carl Sitton, P	3	0	1	1	1	0

Vols	IP	H	R	BB	SO	HR
Carl Sitton, W	9.0	4	0	2	9	0

== Bibliography ==
- Simpson, John A. (2007). The Greatest Game Ever Played In Dixie. McFarland. ISBN 9780786430505.
- Simpson, John A. (2013). Hub Perdue: Clown Prince of the Mound. McFarland. ISBN 978-0786472253.
