= Doc Wiseman =

- Right field
- Born: May 15, 1878; Cincinnati, Ohio, U.S.
- Died: April 3, 1953 (aged 74); Cincinnati, Ohio, U.S.

Teams
- Nashville Vols

Julius Augustus "Doc" Wiseman (May 15, 1878 - April 3, 1953) was an American professional baseball player. He played for several minor league baseball clubs, mostly the Nashville Vols. He played in right field, where at Sulphur Dell there was a hill, known as "the Dump", earning him the nickname "the Goat". In 1901, the first season of the Southern Association, his batting average was .333. He hit the winning run to win the decisive game for the Southern pennant in 1908.
