= Bob Fisher (baseball) =

American baseball player (1886–1963)

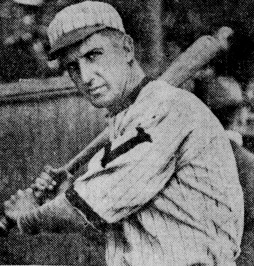
- Shortstop
- Born: November 3, 1886; Nashville, Tennessee, U.S.
- Died: August 4, 1963 (aged 76); Jacksonville, Florida, U.S.
- Batted: Switch Threw: Right

MLB debut
- June 3, 1912, for the Brooklyn Dodgers

Last MLB appearance
- April 25, 1919, for the St. Louis Cardinals

MLB statistics
- Batting average: .276
- Home runs: 11
- Runs batted in: 170
- Stats at Baseball Reference

Teams
- Brooklyn Dodgers/Superbas (1912–1913); Chicago Cubs (1914–1915); Cincinnati Reds (1916); St. Louis Cardinals (1918–1919)

Robert Taylor Fisher (November 3, 1886 – August 4, 1963) was an American professional baseball shortstop, who played in Major League Baseball from 1912 to 1919.

In 503 games over seven seasons, Fisher posted a .276 batting average (480-for-1,742) with 189 runs, 11 home runs, and 170 RBIs. He recorded a .933 fielding percentage playing at shortstop and second base.

His older brother, Newt Fisher, played nine games for the Philadelphia Phillies in 1898.
