= 1909 Atlanta Crackers season =

Minor League baseball team season

1909 Atlanta Crackers
- Southern Association champions
- League: Southern Association
- Ballpark: Ponce de Leon Park
- City: Atlanta, Georgia
- Record: 87–49 (.640)
- League place: 1st
- Owner: John Heisman
- Manager: Billy Smith

The 1909 Atlanta Crackers season represented the Atlanta Crackers baseball team in the Southern Association and won the league pennant. John Heisman was president of the group of owners. The team was managed by Billy Smith and led by Dutch Jordan. The team included Tommy Atkins, Scotty Barr, Bill Bartley, Dick Bayless, Roy Castleton, Tom Fisher, Enos Kirkpatrick, Roy Moran, and Syd Smith. Manager Billy Smith credited Syd Smith as the team's best player.

The Crackers had just a .222 batting average on the season. Both Tom Fisher and Harold Johns had 20-win seasons, and Tommy Atkins won 19. Only Nashville's Hub Perdue won more games as a pitcher in the Southern Association.
