= Dixie Series =

Minor league baseball postseason championship series

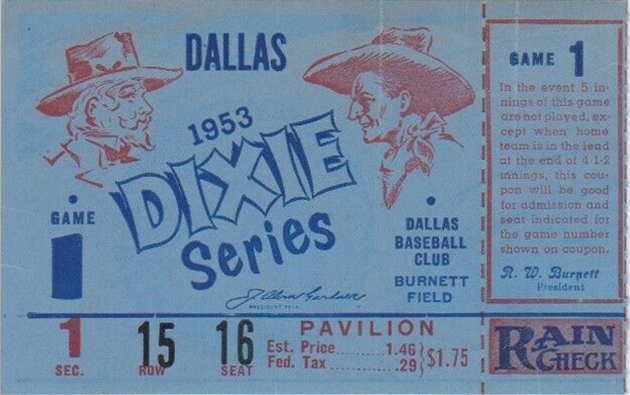
A ticket for Game 1 of the 1953 Dixie Series between the Nashville Vols and Dallas Eagles

The Dixie Series was an interleague postseason series between the playoff champions of Minor League Baseball's Southern Association (SA) and Texas League (TL). The best-of-seven series was held at the conclusion of each season from 1920 to 1958, with the exception of 1943 to 1945 due to World War II. It was revived by the Dixie Association for one year in 1967, pitting the Texas League champion against the Southern League (SL) champion.

With 19 wins, Texas League teams won the most Dixie Series championships, while 17 were won by the Southern Association and 1 by the Southern League. The Fort Worth Cats won eight Dixie Series, more than any other team. They are followed by the Birmingham Barons (6); the Houston Buffaloes and Nashville Vols (4); the Dallas Rangers (3); the Atlanta Crackers, Mobile Bears, and New Orleans Pelicans (2); and the Chattanooga Lookouts, Memphis Chicks, Oklahoma City Indians, San Antonio Missions, Tulsa Oilers, and Wichita Falls Spudders (1).

Four Dixie Series were won by teams affiliated with the St. Louis Cardinals of Major League Baseball (MLB), more than any other major league organization. They are followed by the Boston Red Sox, Brooklyn Dodgers, Cleveland Indians, and Detroit Tigers organizations (2); and the Chicago Cubs, Chicago White Sox, Kansas City Athletics, Milwaukee Braves, St. Louis Browns, and Washington Senators organizations (1). Nineteen Dixie Series were won by teams which were not affiliated with any MLB organization.

== Results ==
Year	Winning team (MLB affiliation)	League	Score	Losing team (MLB affiliation)	League	Ref.
1920	Fort Worth Panthers (—)	TL	4–2–1	Little Rock Travelers (—)	SA	
1921	Fort Worth Panthers (—)	TL	4–2	Memphis Chicks (—)	SA	
1922	Mobile Bears (—)	SA	4–2–1	Fort Worth Panthers (—)	TL	
1923	Fort Worth Panthers (—)	TL	4–2–1	New Orleans Pelicans (—)	SA	
1924	Fort Worth Panthers (—)	TL	4–3–1	Memphis Chicks (—)	SA	
1925	Fort Worth Panthers (—)	TL	4–2	Atlanta Crackers (—)	SA	
1926	Dallas Steers (—)	TL	4–2–1	New Orleans Pelicans (—)	SA	
1927	Wichita Falls Spudders (—)	TL	4–0	New Orleans Pelicans (—)	SA	
1928	Houston Buffaloes (STL)	TL	4–2	Birmingham Barons (—)	SA	
1929	Birmingham Barons (—)	SA	4–2	Dallas Steers (—)	TL	
1930	Fort Worth Panthers (—)	TL	4–1	Memphis Chicks (—)	SA	
1931	Birmingham Barons (—)	SA	4–3	Houston Buffaloes (STL)	TL	
1932	Chattanooga Lookouts (WSH)	SA	4–1	Beaumont Exporters (DET)	TL	
1933	New Orleans Pelicans (CLE)	SA	4–2	San Antonio Missions (SLB)	TL	
1934	New Orleans Pelicans (CLE)	SA	4–2	Galveston Buccaneers (—)	TL	
1935	Oklahoma City Indians (—)	TL	4–2	Atlanta Crackers (—)	SA	
1936	Tulsa Oilers (—)	TL	4–0	Birmingham Barons (—)	SA	
1937	Fort Worth Cats (—)	TL	4–1	Little Rock Travelers (BOS)	SA	
1938	Atlanta Crackers (—)	SA	4–0–1	Beaumont Exporters (DET)	TL	
1939	Fort Worth Cats (—)	TL	4–3	Nashville Vols (BKN)	SA	
1940	Nashville Vols (BKN)	SA	4–1	Houston Buffaloes (STL)	TL	
1941	Nashville Vols (—)	SA	4–0	Dallas Rebels (—)	TL	
1942	Nashville Vols (—)	SA	4–2	Shreveport Sports (CHW)	TL	
1946	Dallas Rebels (DET)	TL	4–0	Atlanta Crackers (—)	SA	
1947	Houston Buffaloes (STL)	TL	4–2	Mobile Bears (BKN)	SA	
1948	Birmingham Barons (BOS)	SA	4–1	Fort Worth Cats (BKN)	TL	
1949	Nashville Vols (CHC)	SA	4–3	Tulsa Oilers (CIN)	TL	
1950	San Antonio Missions (SLB)	TL	4–3	Nashville Vols (CHC)	SA	
1951	Birmingham Barons (BOS)	SA	4–2	Houston Buffaloes (STL)	TL	
1952	Memphis Chicks (CHW)	SA	4–2	Shreveport Sports (—)	TL	
1953	Dallas Eagles (—)	TL	4–2	Nashville Vols (NYG)	SA	
1954	Atlanta Crackers (MIL)	SA	4–3	Houston Buffaloes (STL)	TL	
1955	Mobile Bears (BKN)	SA	4–0	Shreveport Sports (—)	TL	
1956	Houston Buffaloes (STL)	TL	4–2	Atlanta Crackers (MIL)	SA	
1957	Houston Buffaloes (STL)	TL	4–2	Atlanta Crackers (MIL)	SA	
1958	Birmingham Barons (DET)	SA	4–2	Corpus Christi Giants (SF)	TL	
1967	Birmingham A's (KC)	SL	4–2	Albuquerque Dodgers (LA)	TL	

== Appearances by team ==
Apps.	Team	League	Wins	Losses	Win %
10	Fort Worth Cats (Fort Worth Panthers)	TL	8	2	.800
8	Birmingham Barons (Birmingham A's)	SA/SL	6	2	.750
8	Houston Buffaloes	TL	4	4	.500
7	Nashville Vols	SA	4	3	.571
7	Atlanta Crackers	SA	2	5	.286
5	Dallas Rangers (Dallas Steers/Rebels/Eagles)	TL	3	2	.600
5	New Orleans Pelicans	SA	2	3	.400
4	Memphis Chicks	SA	1	3	.250
3	Mobile Bears	SA	2	1	.667
3	Shreveport Sports	TL	0	3	.000
2	San Antonio Missions	TL	1	1	.500
2	Tulsa Oilers	TL	1	1	.500
2	Beaumont Exporters	TL	0	2	.000
2	Little Rock Travelers	SA	0	2	.000
1	Chattanooga Lookouts	SA	1	0	1.000
1	Oklahoma City Indians	TL	1	0	1.000
1	Wichita Falls Spudders	TL	1	0	1.000
1	Albuquerque Dodgers	TL	0	1	.000
1	Corpus Christi Giants	TL	0	1	.000
1	Galveston Buccaneers	TL	0	1	.000

== See also ==
- List of Southern Association champions
- List of Southern League champions
- List of Texas League champions
