= 1901 Nashville Baseball Club season =

8th season of minor league baseball in Tennessee

1901 Nashville Baseball Club
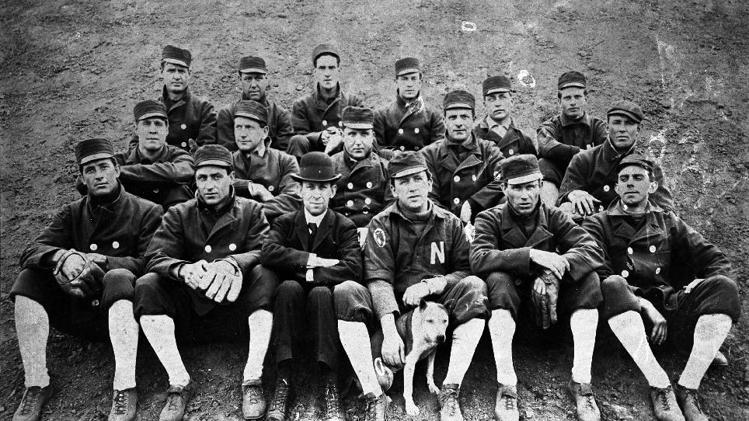
- League: Southern Association
- Ballpark: Athletic Park
- City: Nashville, Tennessee
- Record: 78–45 (.634)
- League place: 1st
- Managers: Newt Fisher

The 1901 Nashville Baseball Club season was the 8th season of minor league baseball in Nashville, Tennessee, and the Nashville Baseball Club's 1st season in the Southern Association. The board of directors awarded the league pennant to Nashville over Little Rock. In 1901, the Southern Association was formed to fill the void left by the folding of the original Southern League. The team was managed by Newt Fisher. The team featured Ed Abbaticchio, Snapper Kennedy, Tom Parrott and War Sanders. Abbatichio led the league in runs.

They played an exhibition game with Vanderbilt's baseball team, whose captain was shortstop Grantland Rice.
