= George Hunter (baseball) =

American baseball player (1887-1968)

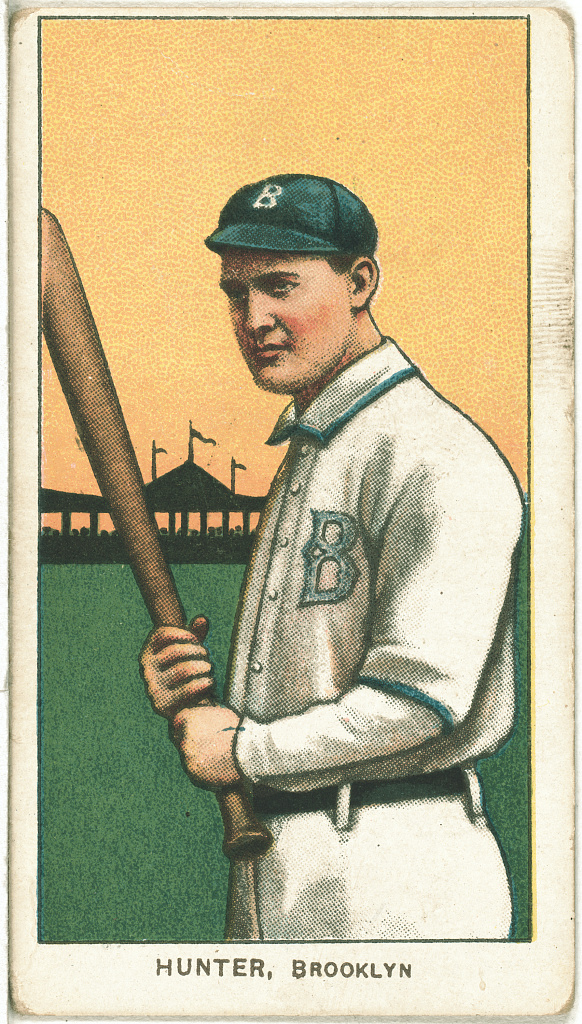
- Pitcher / Outfielder
- Born: July 8, 1887; Buffalo, New York, U.S.
- Died: January 11, 1968 (aged 80); Harrisburg, Pennsylvania, U.S.
- Batted: Switch Threw: Left

MLB debut
- May 4, 1909, for the Brooklyn Superbas

Last MLB appearance
- May 9, 1910, for the Brooklyn Superbas

MLB statistics
- Win–loss record: 4–10
- Earned run average: 2.46
- Strikeouts: 43
- Stats at Baseball Reference

Teams
- Brooklyn Superbas (1909–1910)

George Henry Hunter (July 8, 1887 in Buffalo, New York – January 11, 1968 in Harrisburg, Pennsylvania) was an American pitcher and an outfielder in Major League Baseball. He played for the Brooklyn Superbas during the 1909 and 1910 baseball seasons. His twin brother Bill played for the Cleveland Naps during the 1912 season.
