= Newt Fisher =

American baseball player (1871–1947)

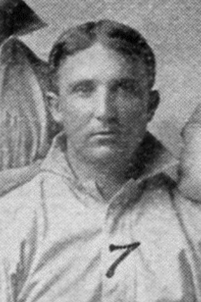
- Fisher with Nashville in 1902
- Catcher
- Born: June 28, 1871; Nashville, Tennessee, United States
- Died: February 28, 1947 (aged 75); Chicago, Illinois, United States
- Batted: Right Threw: Right

MLB debut
- May 17, 1898, for the Philadelphia Phillies

Last MLB appearance
- July 1, 1898, for the Philadelphia Phillies

MLB statistics
- Batting average: .115
- Home runs: 0
- Runs batted in: 0
- Stats at Baseball Reference

Teams
- Philadelphia Phillies (1898)

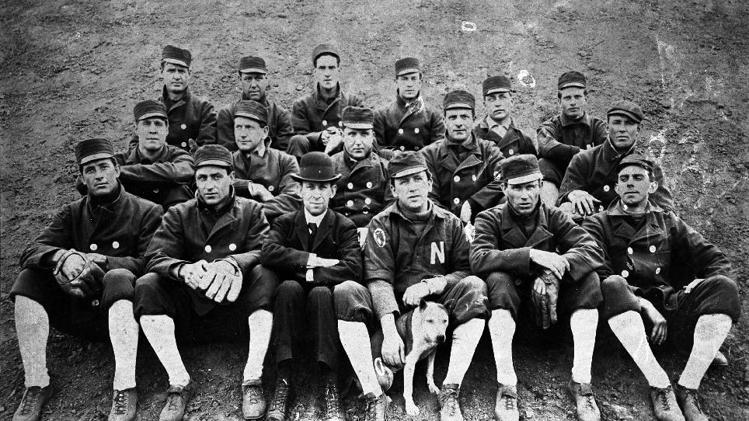
Fisher owned, managed, and played for the 1901 Nashville Baseball Club, champions of the Southern Association.

Isaac Newton "Ike" "Newt" Fisher (June 28, 1871 – February 28, 1947) was an American Major League Baseball catcher. He played for the Philadelphia Phillies of the National League in 1898. Fisher helped organize the Southern Association, a higher-level minor league, and led its Nashville Baseball Club to win the first two Southern Association pennants (1901 and 1902) as a player-manager.

== Early life ==
Fisher was born in Nashville, Tennessee, on June 28, 1871. His younger brother, Bob Fisher, played seven seasons in the National League from 1912 to 1919.

== Career ==
Fisher was a member of the Nashville Athletic Club. During the July 6, 1893, Southern League game between the Nashville Tigers and Memphis Fever Germs, he was recruited to temporarily take the place of injured outfielder Jack Keenan. He played center field and had four at-bats with no hits in his only game with the club.

Fisher began his professional career with the Southern League's Augusta Electricians in 1893, before joining the Atlanta Atlantas in 1894. In 1895, he played for the Chattanooga Warriors/Mobile Bluebirds. He continued with the Mobile Blackbirds in 1896, but also played for the Western League's Detroit Tigers. He was a member of the Western League's Columbus Senators in 1897 and played most of the 1898 season with the Minneapolis Millers.

Fisher made his major league debut on May 17, 1898, with the National League's Philadelphia Phillies. In nine games, he played eight at catcher and one at third base. Through his final game on July 1, Fisher recorded three hits, made one double, stole one base, and had a .115 batting average. He found himself back with Minneapolis in 1899 and 1900.

In late 1900, Fisher, along with other baseball men, organized a new Southern baseball league, the Southern Association. One of its charter members was the Nashville Baseball Club, which would come to be known as the Nashville Vols in 1908. Fisher served as the team's owner and player-manager. Under his leadership from 1901 to 1905, Nashville won the first two Southern Association pennants (1901 and 1902). Fisher sold the team and retired from baseball in 1905. He briefly come out of retirement to play catcher for the South Atlantic League's Macon Peaches in 1908.

Fisher died in Chicago on February 28, 1947.
