= Stan Yerkes =

American baseball player (1874–1940)

- Pitcher
- Born: November 28, 1874; Cheltenham, Pennsylvania, U.S.
- Died: July 28, 1940 (aged 65); Boston, Massachusetts, U.S.
- Batted: Right Threw: Right

MLB debut
- May 3, 1901, for the Baltimore Orioles

Last MLB appearance
- April 17, 1903, for the St. Louis Cardinals

MLB statistics
- Win–loss record: 15–24
- Earned run average: 3.66
- Strikeouts: 103
- Stats at Baseball Reference

Teams
- Baltimore Orioles (1901); St. Louis Cardinals (1901–1903)

Stanley Lewis Yerkes (November 28, 1874 – July 28, 1940), nicknamed "Yank", was an American professional baseball pitcher. He played in Major League Baseball from 1901 to 1903 for the Baltimore Orioles and St. Louis Cardinals. Yerkes set many career highs during the 1902 season while pitching for the Cardinals. He appeared in 39 games (starting 37) during that season, and had a 12–21 record with a 3.66 ERA.

== See also ==
- List of St. Louis Cardinals team records
