= Harry Bay =

American baseball player (1878–1952)

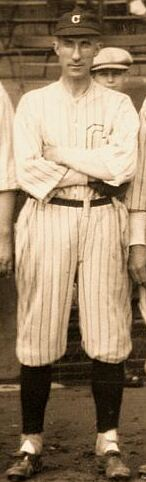
- Bay at an old-timers' game in 1921
- Outfielder
- Born: January 17, 1878; Pontiac, Illinois, U.S.
- Died: March 19, 1952 (aged 74); Peoria, Illinois, U.S.
- Batted: Left Threw: Left

MLB debut
- July 23, 1901, for the Cincinnati Reds

Last MLB appearance
- May 3, 1908, for the Cleveland Naps

MLB statistics
- Batting average: .273
- Home runs: 5
- Runs batted in: 141
- Stolen bases: 169
- Stats at Baseball Reference

Teams
- Cincinnati Reds (1901–1902); Cleveland Bronchos/Naps (1902–1908)

Career highlights and awards
- 2× AL stolen base leader (1903, 1904)

Harry Elbert "Deerfoot" Bay (January 17, 1878 – March 19, 1952) was an American professional baseball player who played outfield in the major leagues from 1901 to 1908. Bay played for the Cincinnati Reds and Cleveland Bronchos/Naps.

== Early life ==
He attended Peoria High School, winning medals in the 1896 and 1897 Illinois High School Association state track and field meets. He played high school baseball with Harry Frazee, a future owner of the Boston Red Sox.

After high school, he was on a barnstorming team in the Midwest that featured star pitcher Joe McGinnity, but Bay also attracted attention, signing a professional contract in 1898 with a team in Lincoln, Illinois. Bay acquired two nicknames; "Deerfoot" referred to his speed, and "Sliver" was a reference to his 5-foot-8-inch (1.73 m), 138-pound (63 kg) frame.

== Career ==
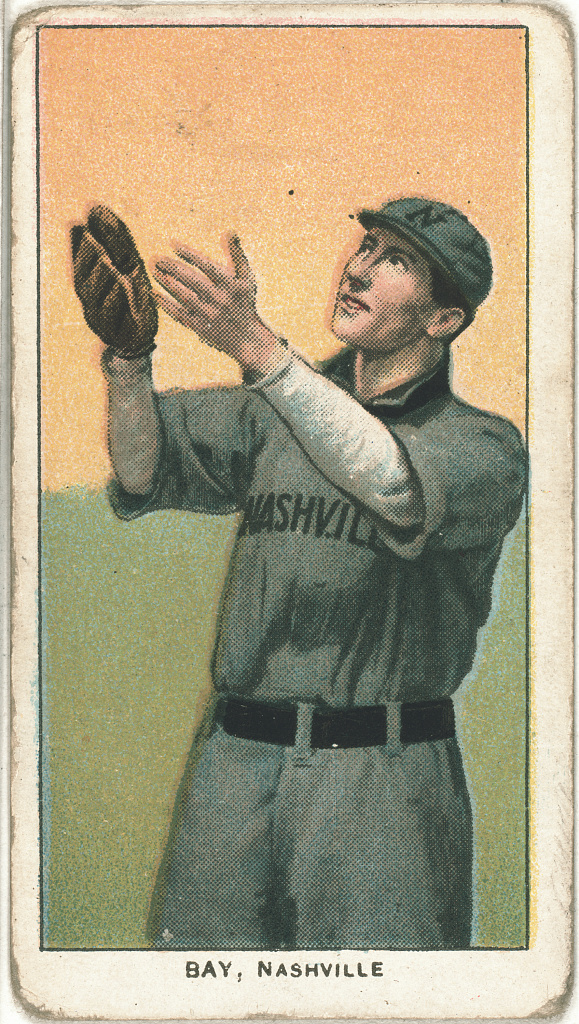
A baseball card of Bay, c. 1909

By 1901, Bay was in the major leagues with the Cincinnati Reds. In May 1902, Bay was released by the Reds and signed by the Cleveland Bronchos. He led the American League in stolen bases in 1903 and 1904 with 45 and 38 respectively as a member of the Cleveland Naps.

Bay had a .301 batting average and 36 stolen bases in 1905, but he injured his shoulder while sliding into a base and hurt his knee catching a ball on a muddy field. The knee injury slowed him down for the remainder of his career, and he never played a full season again. He retired in 1908. In 675 games over eight seasons, Bay posted a .273 batting average (722-for-2640) with 413 runs, 42 triples, 5 home runs, 141 RBIs, 169 stolen bases and 195 bases on balls. He recorded a .968 fielding percentage playing at all three outfield positions.

Bay played cornet and piano, and during his playing career he sometimes appeared in concerts and skits.

== After baseball ==
After retiring from baseball in 1908, he returned to Peoria, became a bandleader at the local Apollo Theater, and toured the vaudeville circuit with Guy Kibbee. He later worked for the Peoria fire department and the Illinois Secretary of State.

In February 1952, Bay slipped while walking on ice and broke several ribs. He died a few weeks later.

== See also ==
- List of Major League Baseball annual stolen base leaders
