= Johnny Siegle =

American baseball player (1874–1968)

- Outfielder
- Born: July 8, 1874; Urbana, Ohio, U.S.
- Died: February 12, 1968 (aged 93); Urbana, Ohio, U.S.
- Batted: Right Threw: Right

MLB debut
- September 15, 1905, for the Cincinnati Reds

Last MLB appearance
- October 7, 1906, for the Cincinnati Reds

MLB statistics
- Batting average: .202
- Home runs: 1
- Runs batted in: 15
- Stats at Baseball Reference

Teams
- Cincinnati Reds (1905–1906)

John Herbert Siegle (July 8, 1874 – February 12, 1968) was an American Major League Baseball outfielder. He played parts of two seasons in the majors, 1905 and 1906, for the Cincinnati Reds. His minor league career spanned 16 seasons, between 1899 and 1914.

== Sources ==
- Career statistics from Baseball Reference · Baseball Reference (Minors) · Retrosheet · Baseball Almanac
