= Pryor McElveen =

American baseball player (1881–1951)

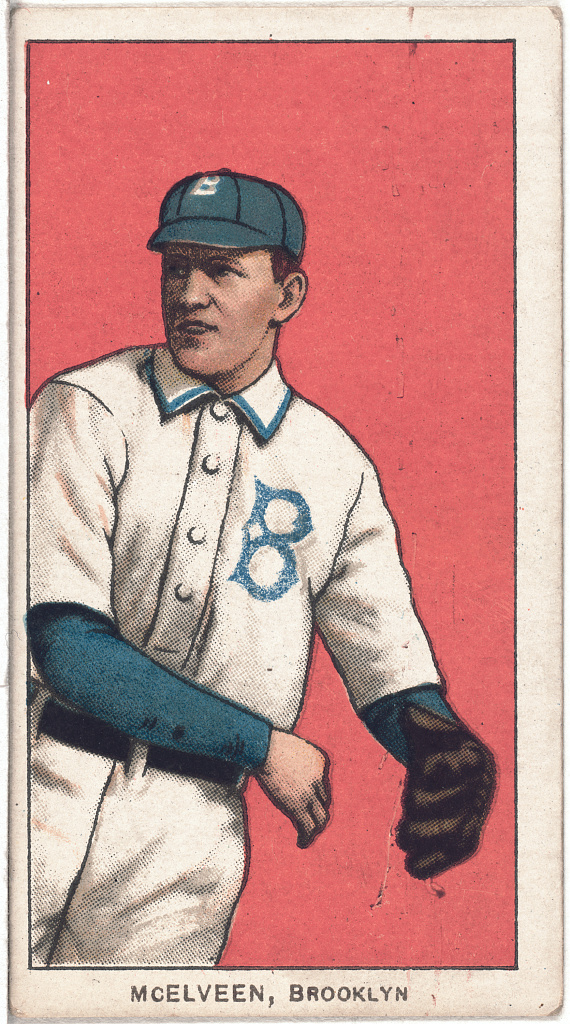
- Third baseman
- Born: November 5, 1881; Atlanta, Georgia, U.S.
- Died: October 27, 1951 (aged 69); Pleasant Hill, Tennessee, U.S.
- Batted: Right Threw: Right

MLB debut
- April 26, 1909, for the Brooklyn Superbas

Last MLB appearance
- June 4, 1911, for the Brooklyn Dodgers

MLB statistics
- Batting average: .209
- Home runs: 4
- Runs batted in: 56
- Stats at Baseball Reference

Teams
- Brooklyn Superbas/Dodgers (1909–1911)

Pryor Mynatt "Humpy" McElveen (November 5, 1881 – October 27, 1951) was an American professional baseball player and coach. McElveen played third base for the Brooklyn Dodgers from 1909 to 1911. He attended Carson–Newman College. A native of Johnson City, Tennessee, he was team captain of the 1908 Southern Association champion Nashville Vols, and was a personal friend of sportswriter Fred Russell. He coached at his alma mater Carson–Newman.

== Bibliography ==
- Simpson, John A. (July 23, 2007). The Greatest Game Ever Played In Dixie. ISBN 978-0-7864-3050-5.
