= Kid Butler (infielder) =

American baseball player (1887–1964)

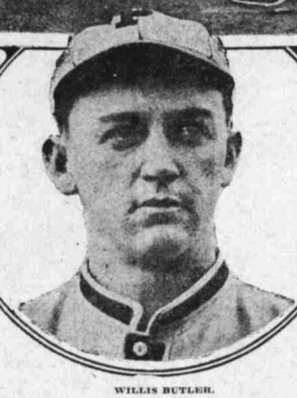
- Infielder
- Born: August 9, 1887; Franklin, Pennsylvania, U.S.
- Died: February 22, 1964 (aged 76); Richmond, California, U.S.
- Batted: Right Threw: Right

MLB debut
- April 30, 1907, for the St. Louis Browns

Last MLB appearance
- August 2, 1907, for the St. Louis Browns

MLB statistics
- Batting average: .220
- Home runs: 0
- Runs batted in: 6
- Stats at Baseball Reference

Teams
- St. Louis Browns (1907)

Willis Everett "Kid" Butler (August 9, 1887 – February 22, 1964) was an American infielder in Major League Baseball. He played for the St. Louis Browns in 1907.
