= Bill Bernhard =

American baseball player (1871–1949)

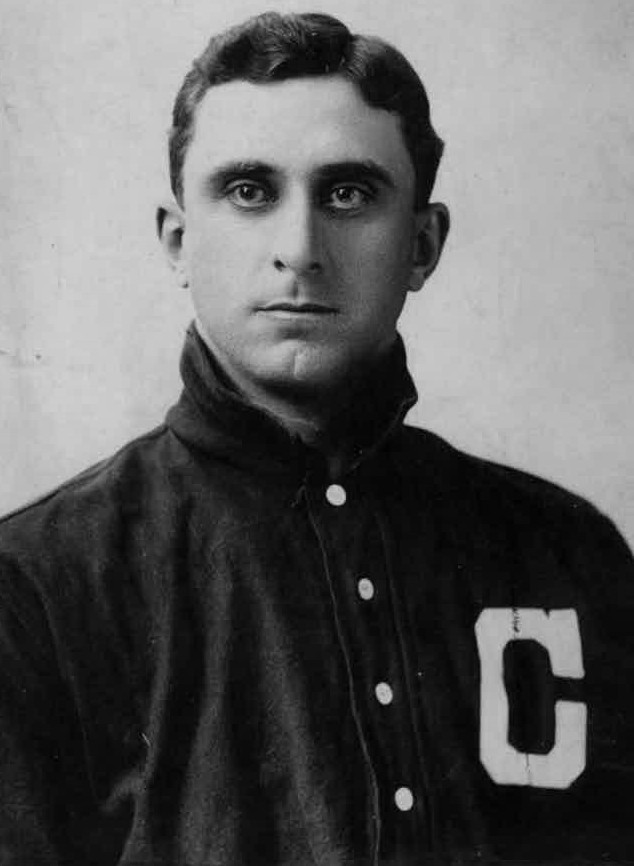
- Pitcher
- Born: March 16, 1871; Clarence, New York, U.S.
- Died: March 30, 1949 (aged 78); San Diego, California, U.S.
- Batted: Switch Threw: Right

MLB debut
- April 24, 1899, for the Philadelphia Phillies

Last MLB appearance
- September 19, 1907, for the Cleveland Naps

MLB statistics
- Win–loss record: 116–82
- Earned run average: 3.04
- Strikeouts: 585
- Stats at Baseball Reference

Teams
- Philadelphia Phillies (1899–1900); Philadelphia Athletics (1901–1902); Cleveland Bronchos/Naps (1902–1907)

William Henry "Strawberry Bill" Bernhard (March 16, 1871 – March 30, 1949) was an American professional baseball pitcher. He played in Major League Baseball (MLB) from 1899 to 1907 for the Philadelphia Phillies, Philadelphia Athletics, and Cleveland Bronchos / Naps.

After his playing career ended, he became a manager in the Southern Association. He most notably managed the 1908 Southern champion Nashville Vols.

== Nashville ==
Ferdinand E. Kuhn hired him to the position as manager of the Nashville club.
