= Hub Perdue =

American baseball player (1882–1968)

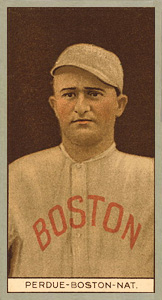
- Pitcher
- Born: June 7, 1882; Bethpage, Tennessee, U.S.
- Died: October 31, 1968 (aged 86); Gallatin, Tennessee, U.S.
- Batted: Right Threw: Right

MLB debut
- April 19, 1911, for the Boston Rustlers

Last MLB appearance
- September 30, 1915, for the St. Louis Cardinals

MLB statistics
- Win–loss record: 51–64
- Earned run average: 3.85
- Strikeouts: 317
- Stats at Baseball Reference

Teams
- Boston Rustlers/Braves (1911–1914); St. Louis Cardinals (1914–1915)

Herbert Rodney "Hub" Perdue (June 7, 1882 – October 31, 1968), also known as "the Gallatin Squash", was an American professional baseball player who played pitcher in the Major Leagues from 1911 to 1915. He played for the St. Louis Cardinals and Boston Braves. He later managed the Nashville Volunteers in the Southern Association in 1921.

== Professional career ==
Perdue played his first professional season in 1906 with the minor league Vincennes Alices of the Class D Kentucky–Illinois–Tennessee League. From 1907 to 1910, he pitched for the Class A Nashville Vols of the Southern Association. He led all pitchers in the league with 23 wins in 1909.

He was drafted by the Brooklyn Superbas of the National League from Nashville on September 1, 1910, in the Rule 5 draft. Before the beginning of the 1911 season, Perdue was selected off waivers by the Boston Rustlers. He then played with the Rustlers, later to become the Boston Braves, from 1911 to 1914. After four seasons of play, he accumulated a 37–44 (.457) win–loss record with a 4.03 earned run average (ERA) and struck out 245 batters. In 1912, he and Grover Cleveland Alexander lead the league in fewest home runs allowed, having yielded only eleven.

The Braves traded Perdue to the National League's St. Louis Cardinals for outfielders Ted Cather and Possum Whitted on June 28, 1914. He pitched with the Cardinals for the rest of the 1914 season and in 1915. At the end of two seasons, his record with St. Louis was 14–20 (.412) with a 3.42 ERA and 72 strikeouts. This was Perdue's final stretch in the majors. His career major league record was 51–64 (.443) with a 3.85 ERA and 317 strikeouts.

In 1916, he played with the American Association's Louisville Colonels. He continued with the Colonels in 1917, but also pitched for the Southern Association's Chattanooga Lookouts. The 1918 season was split between the Minneapolis Millers of the American Association and the Southern Association's New Orleans Pelicans. After playing with the Pelicans again in 1919 and 1920, Perdue returned to the Nashville Vols in 1920. He did not play in 1921, but played with the Texas League's Shreveport Gassers and Wichita Falls Spudders in 1922. His final professional season was the 1923 campaign which he spent with the Charlotte Hornets of the South Atlantic League. His career minor league record was 168–129 (.566).
