= List of Southern Association champions =

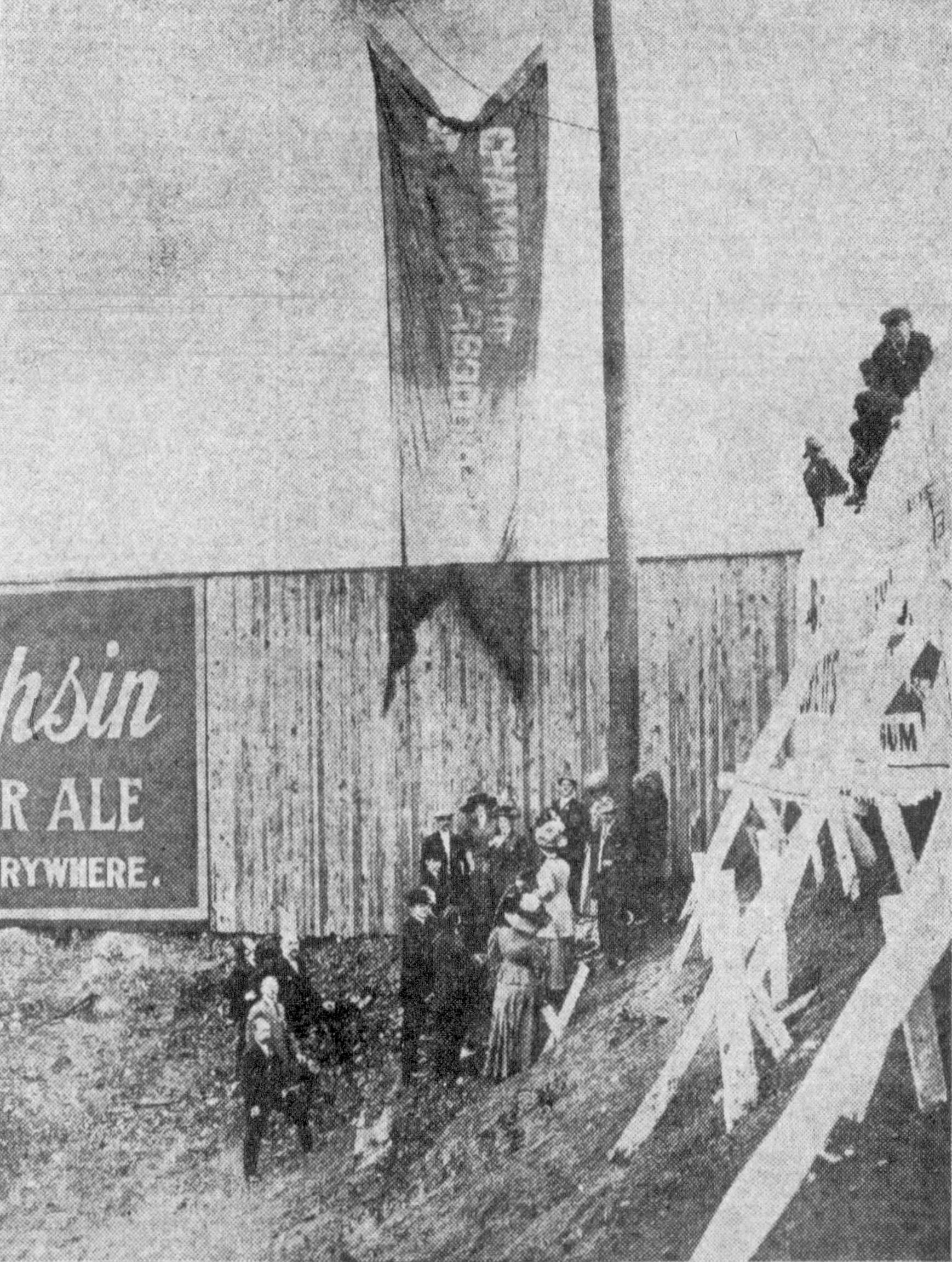
The 1908 Southern Association pennant being hoisted at Sulphur Dell in Nashville, Tennessee

The Southern Association of Minor League Baseball was a baseball league that operated in the United States from 1901 to 1961. A league champion was determined at the end of each season. Champions were determined by postseason playoffs or winning the regular season pennant.

With 18 pennant wins, the Atlanta Crackers won the most regular season pennants in the history of the Southern Association. They are followed by the New Orleans Pelicans (9); Birmingham Barons, Memphis Egyptians/Chicks, and Nashville Baseball Club/Vols (8); Chattanooga Lookouts and Little Rock Travelers (4); and Mobile Bears (2).

The Nashville Vols have the most playoff championships, with nine. They are followed by the Atlanta Crackers (6); Birmingham Barons (5); Mobile Bears (4); New Orleans Pelicans (3); Little Rock Travelers (2); and Memphis Chicks (1).

Considering all championships, both pennants and playoffs, the Atlanta Crackers (24) have the most in league history. They are followed by the Nashville Baseball Club/Vols (17); Birmingham Barons (13); New Orleans Pelicans (12); Memphis Egyptians/Chicks (9); Little Rock Travelers and Mobile Bears (6); and Chattanooga Lookouts (4).

== History ==
League champions were determined by different means throughout the Southern Associations's existence. Champions from 1901 to 1927 and from 1929 to 1931 were simply the regular season pennant winners. In 1928 and from 1932, either the top two or four teams in the league competed in playoffs to determine a league champion. These playoffs varied between being best-of-five and best-of-seven contests.

== Pennant winners ==
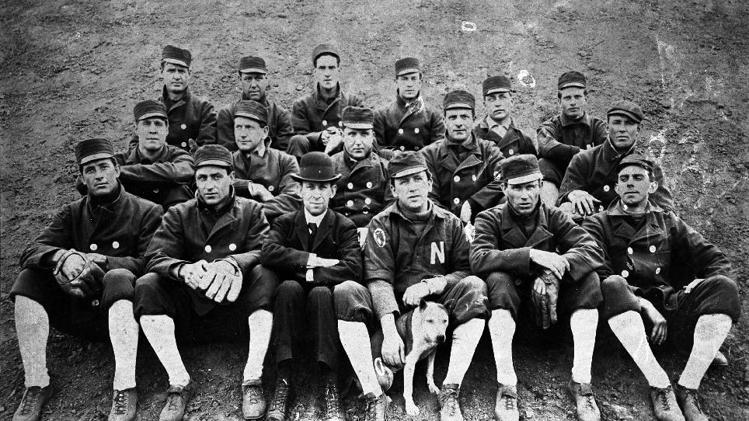
The Nashville Baseball Club won the first Southern Association pennant in 1901.

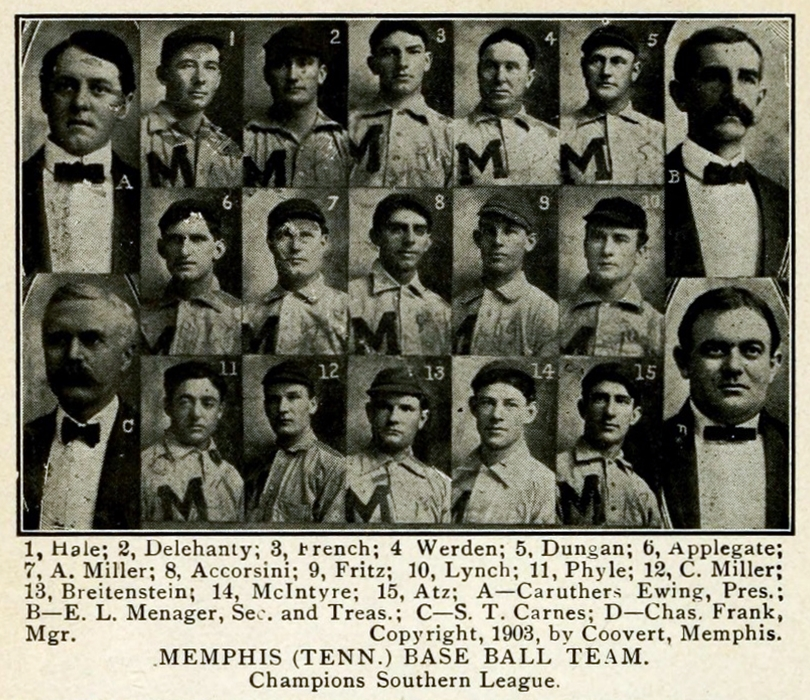
The Memphis Egyptians, 1903 pennant winners

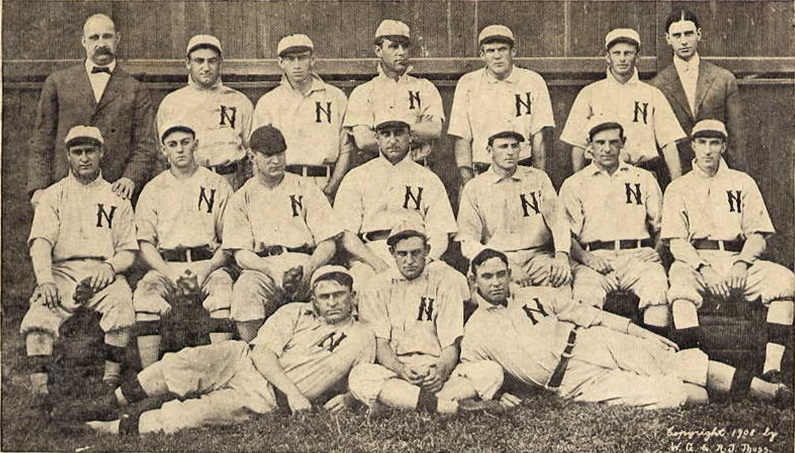
The Nashville Vols, 1908 pennant winners

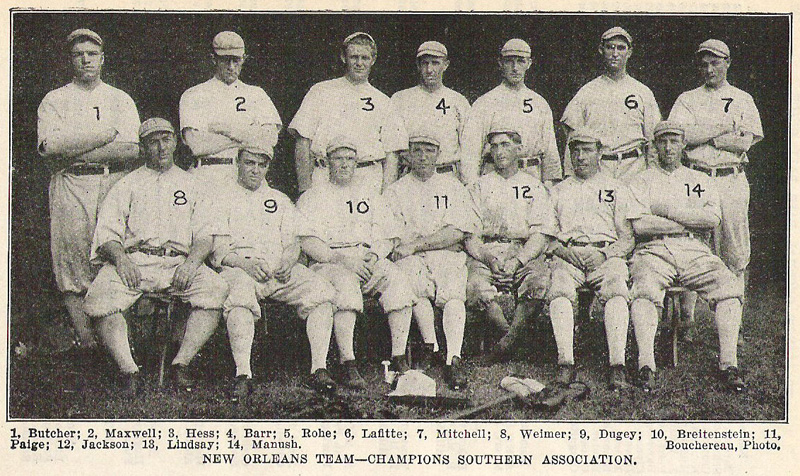
The New Orleans Pelicans, 1910 pennant winners

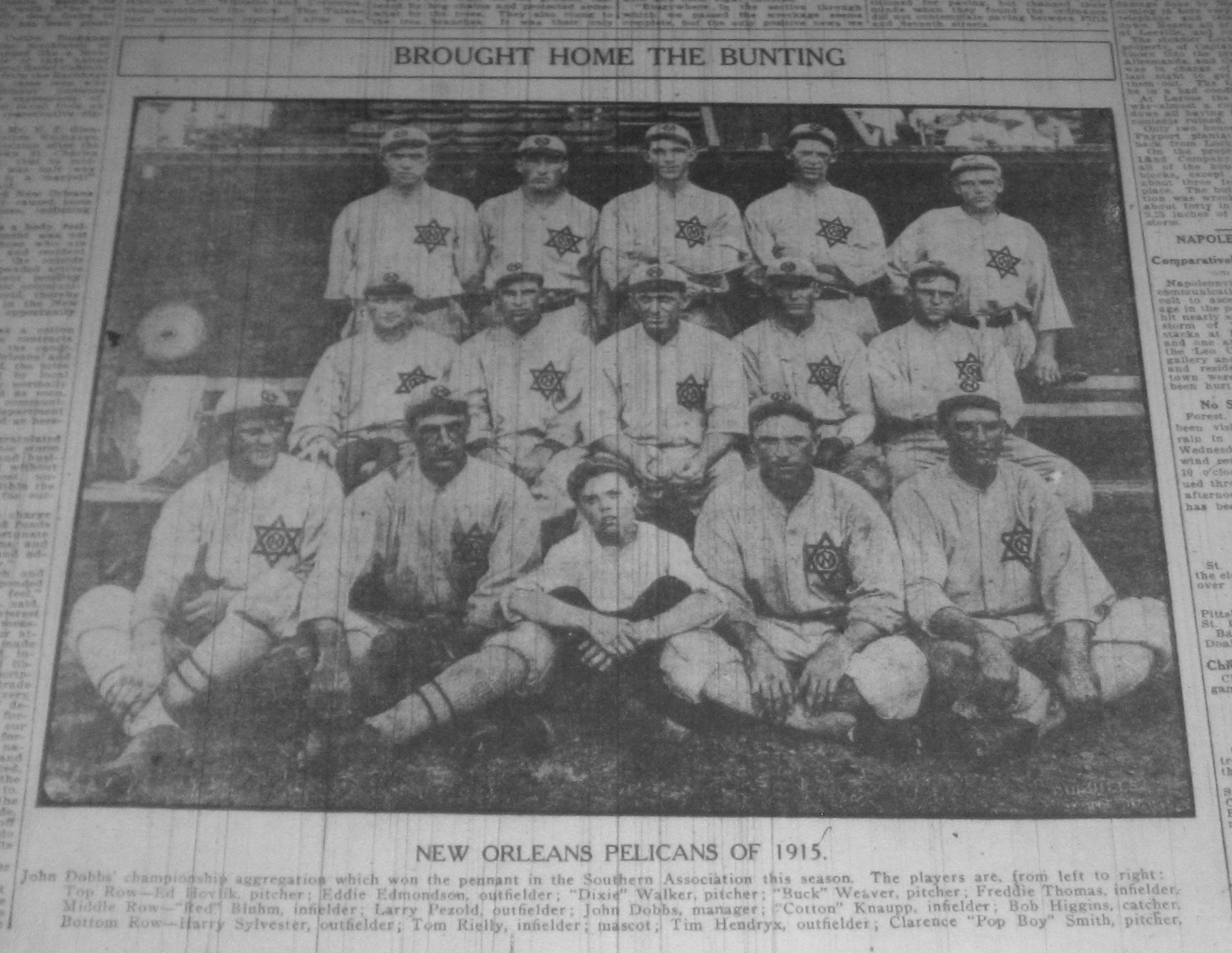
The New Orleans Pelicans, 1915 pennant winners

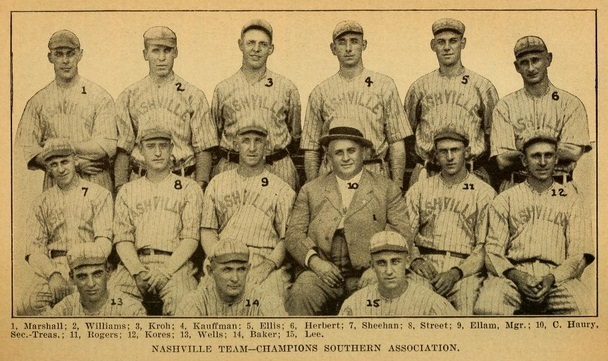
The Nashville Vols, 1916 pennant winners

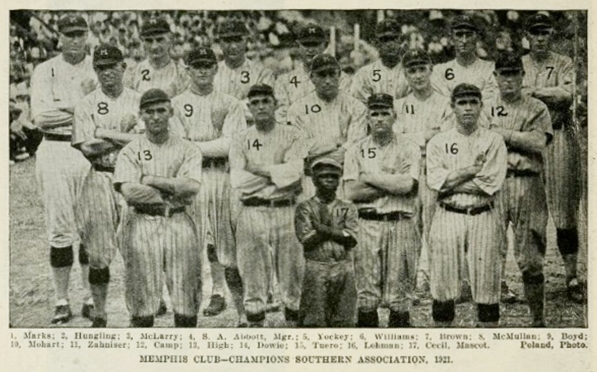
The Memphis Chicks, 1921 pennant winners

| Year | Pennant winner |
|---|---|
| 1901 | Nashville Baseball Club |
| 1902 | Nashville Baseball Club |
| 1903 | Memphis Egyptians |
| 1904 | Memphis Egyptians |
| 1905 | New Orleans Pelicans |
| 1906 | Birmingham Barons |
| 1907 | Atlanta Crackers |
| 1908 | Nashville Vols |
| 1909 | Atlanta Crackers |
| 1910 | New Orleans Pelicans |
| 1911 | New Orleans Pelicans |
| 1912 | Birmingham Barons |
| 1913 | Atlanta Crackers |
| 1914 | Birmingham Barons |
| 1915 | New Orleans Pelicans |
| 1916 | Nashville Vols |
| 1917 | Atlanta Crackers |
| 1918 | New Orleans Pelicans (Note: The Southern Association suspended play on June 28 due to World War I.) |
| 1919 | Atlanta Crackers |
| 1920 | Little Rock Travelers |
| 1921 | Memphis Chicks |
| 1922 | Mobile Bears |
| 1923 | New Orleans Pelicans |
| 1924 | Memphis Chicks |
| 1925 | Atlanta Crackers |
| 1926 | New Orleans Pelicans |
| 1927 | New Orleans Pelicans |
| 1928 | Birmingham Barons |
| 1929 | Birmingham Barons |
| 1930 | Memphis Chicks |
| 1931 | Birmingham Barons |
| 1932 | Chattanooga Lookouts |
| 1933 | Memphis Chicks |
| 1934 | New Orleans Pelicans |
| 1935 | Atlanta Crackers |
| 1936 | Atlanta Crackers |
| 1937 | Little Rock Travelers |
| 1938 | Atlanta Crackers |
| 1939 | Chattanooga Lookouts |
| 1940 | Nashville Vols |
| 1941 | Atlanta Crackers |
| 1942 | Little Rock Travelers |
| 1943 | Nashville Vols |
| 1944 | Atlanta Crackers |
| 1945 | Atlanta Crackers |
| 1946 | Atlanta Crackers |
| 1947 | Mobile Bears |
| 1948 | Nashville Vols |
| 1949 | Nashville Vols |
| 1950 | Atlanta Crackers |
| 1951 | Little Rock Travelers |
| 1952 | Chattanooga Lookouts |
| 1953 | Memphis Chicks |
| 1954 | Atlanta Crackers |
| 1955 | Memphis Chicks |
| 1956 | Atlanta Crackers |
| 1957 | Atlanta Crackers |
| 1958 | Birmingham Barons |
| 1959 | Birmingham Barons |
| 1960 | Atlanta Crackers |
| 1961 | Chattanooga Lookouts |

== Playoff champions ==
Scores and runner-up teams are absent when no playoffs were held or pennant winners were declared champions.

| Year | Champion | Score | Runner-up |
|---|---|---|---|
| 1928 | Birmingham Barons | 4–0 | Memphis Chicks |
| 1929 | None held | | |
| 1930 | None held | | |
| 1931 | None held | | |
| 1932 | None held | | |
| 1933 | New Orleans Pelicans | 3–2 | Memphis Chicks |
| 1934 | New Orleans Pelicans | 3–2 | Nashville Vols |
| 1935 | Atlanta Crackers | 3–0 | New Orleans Pelicans |
| 1936 | Birmingham Barons | 3–0–1 | New Orleans Pelicans |
| 1937 | Little Rock Travelers | 4–3 | Atlanta Crackers |
| 1938 | Atlanta Crackers | 4–1–1 | Nashville Vols |
| 1939 | Nashville Vols | 4–3 | Atlanta Crackers |
| 1940 | Nashville Vols | 4–2 | Atlanta Crackers |
| 1941 | Nashville Vols | 4–3 | Atlanta Crackers |
| 1942 | Nashville Vols | 4–0 | Little Rock Travelers |
| 1943 | Nashville Vols | 4–1 | New Orleans Pelicans |
| 1944 | Nashville Vols | 4–3 | Memphis Chicks |
| 1945 | Mobile Bears | 4–1 | New Orleans Pelicans |
| 1946 | Atlanta Crackers | 4–3 | Memphis Chicks |
| 1947 | Mobile Bears | 4–3 | Nashville Vols |
| 1948 | Birmingham Barons | 4–2 | Nashville Vols |
| 1949 | Nashville Vols | 4–2 | Mobile Bears |
| 1950 | Nashville Vols | 4–1 | Atlanta Crackers |
| 1951 | Birmingham Barons | 4–0 | Little Rock Travelers |
| 1952 | Memphis Chicks | 4–2–1 | Mobile Bears |
| 1953 | Nashville Vols | 4–1 | Birmingham Barons |
| 1954 | Atlanta Crackers | 4–1 | New Orleans Pelicans |
| 1955 | Mobile Bears | 4–2 | Birmingham Barons |
| 1956 | Atlanta Crackers | 4–3 | Memphis Chicks |
| 1957 | Atlanta Crackers | 4–0 | Nashville Vols |
| 1958 | Birmingham Barons | 4–1 | Mobile Bears |
| 1959 | Mobile Bears | 4–1 | Birmingham Barons |
| 1960 | Little Rock Travelers | 3–2 | Birmingham Barons |

== Championship wins by club ==
=== Pennants ===
| Wins | Team | Championship years |
|---|---|---|
| 18 | Atlanta Crackers | 1907, 1909, 1913, 1917, 1919, 1925, 1935, 1936, 1938, 1941, 1944, 1945, 1946, 1950, 1954, 1956, 1957, 1960 |
| 9 | New Orleans Pelicans | 1905, 1910, 1911, 1915, 1923, 1926, 1927, 1934, 1918 |
| 8 | Birmingham Barons | 1906, 1912, 1914, 1928, 1929, 1931, 1958, 1959 |
| 8 | Memphis Egyptians/Chicks | 1903, 1904, 1921, 1924, 1930, 1933, 1953, 1955 |
| 8 | Nashville Baseball Club/Vols | 1901, 1902, 1908, 1916, 1940, 1943, 1948, 1949 |
| 4 | Chattanooga Lookouts | 1932, 1939, 1952, 1961 |
| 4 | Little Rock Travelers | 1920, 1937, 1942, 1951 |
| 2 | Mobile Bears | 1922, 1947 |

=== Playoffs ===
| Wins | Team | Championship years |
|---|---|---|
| 9 | Nashville Vols | 1939, 1940, 1941, 1942, 1943, 1944, 1949, 1950, 1953 |
| 6 | Atlanta Crackers | 1935, 1938, 1946, 1954, 1956, 1957 |
| 5 | Birmingham Barons | 1928, 1936, 1948, 1951, 1958 |
| 4 | Mobile Bears | 1945, 1947, 1955, 1959 |
| 3 | New Orleans Pelicans | 1932, 1933, 1934 |
| 2 | Little Rock Travelers | 1937, 1960 |
| 1 | Memphis Chicks | 1952 |

== See also ==
- U.S. minor league baseball awards
