= Nashville Vols =

Former Minor League Baseball team in Nashville, Tennessee

- 1901–1963; (1901–1961, 1963); Nashville, Tennessee
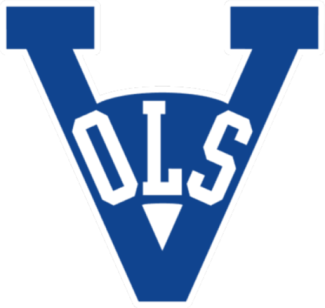
Team logo
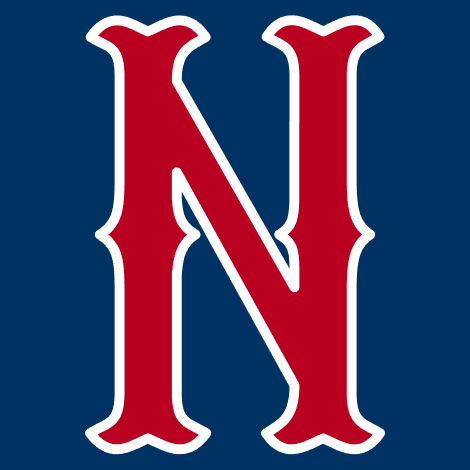
Cap insignia

Minor league affiliations
- Class: Double-A (1946–1961, 1963); Class A1 (1936–1945); Class A (1902–1935); Class B (1901)
- League: South Atlantic League (1963); Southern Association (1901–1961)

Major league affiliations
- Team: Los Angeles Angels (1963); Minnesota Twins (1961); Cincinnati Reds (1955–1960); New York Giants (1952–1954); Chicago Cubs (1943–1951); Brooklyn Dodgers (1938–1940); Cincinnati Reds (1936–1937); New York Giants (1934–1935)

Minor league titles
- Dixie Series titles (4): 1940; 1941; 1942; 1949
- League titles (9): 1939; 1940; 1941; 1942; 1943; 1944; 1949; 1950; 1953
- Pennants (8): 1901; 1902; 1908; 1916; 1940; 1943; 1948; 1949
- First-half titles (2): 1934; 1943
- Second-half titles (1): 1944

Team data
- Name: Nashville Volunteers (1908–1961, 1963); Nashville Baseball Club (1901–1907)
- Ballpark: Sulphur Dell (1901–1961, 1963)

The Nashville Vols were a Minor League Baseball team that played in Nashville, Tennessee, from 1901 to 1963. Known as the Nashville Baseball Club during their first seven seasons, they became the Nashville Volunteers (regularly shortened to Vols) in 1908 in reference to Tennessee's nickname, "The Volunteer State" (a name now mostly associated with the University of Tennessee). The Vols played their home games at Athletic Park, which had been home to the city's professional baseball teams since 1885 and was renamed Sulphur Dell in 1908.

The Nashville club was formed as a charter member of the Southern Association in 1901 and remained in the league until it disbanded after the 1961 season. The circuit operated at several classifications: Class B (1901), Class A (1902–1935), Class A1 (1936–1945), and Double-A (1946–1961). Over 61 seasons in the Southern Association, the Vols won eight league pennants, nine playoff championships, and four Dixie Series titles. The team sat out the 1962 season, primarily due to the league's collapse, but returned for a final campaign in the Double-A South Atlantic League in 1963 before ceasing operations altogether.

During 35 seasons, Nashville was not affiliated with any Major League Baseball team. Across 27 seasons, they served as a farm club for six major league franchises: the New York Giants (1934–1935, 1952–1954), Cincinnati Reds (1936–1937, 1955–1960), Brooklyn Dodgers (1938–1940), Chicago Cubs (1943–1951), Minnesota Twins (1961), and Los Angeles Angels (1963). A total of 28 managers led the club and its more than 1,200 players. Over 62 seasons, the Vols played 9,015 regular-season games and compiled a win–loss record of 4,569–4,446 (.507). They qualified for postseason playoffs on 16 occasions in which they had a record of 108–74–1 (.593). Combining all 9,198 regular-season and postseason games, Nashville's all-time record was 4,677–4,520–1 (.509).

== History ==
=== Prior professional baseball in Nashville ===
Nashville has been home to Minor League Baseball teams since the late 19th century. The city's professional baseball history dates back to 1884 with the formation of the Nashville Americans, who were charter members of the original Southern League from 1885 to 1886 and played their home games at Sulphur Spring Park, later renamed Athletic Park and Sulphur Dell. The ballpark was located just north of the Tennessee State Capitol in downtown Nashville on the block bounded by modern-day Junior Gilliam Way, Fourth Avenue North, Harrison Street, and Fifth Avenue North. It was the home of Nashville's minor league teams through 1963. In 1887, Nashville's Southern League team was called the Nashville Blues. The Nashville Tigers competed in the same league from 1893 to 1894. In 1895, the Nashville Seraphs won the city's first professional championship in the Southern League. The Nashville Centennials played in the Central League in 1897 but relocated to Henderson, Kentucky, during the season before the league's collapse.

=== Early days (1901–1907) ===
Following a three-year absence from professional baseball, the sport returned to Nashville in 1901. On December 15, 1900, baseball leaders from across the South met in Atlanta, Georgia, to establish the Class B Southern Association (sometimes referred to as the Southern League). A franchise was granted to Nashville's representative, Newt Fisher, who would be the team's first manager. The Nashville Baseball Club, as they would not become known as the Nashville Volunteers until 1908, played their home games at Athletic Park, which also gained its Sulphur Dell moniker in 1908.

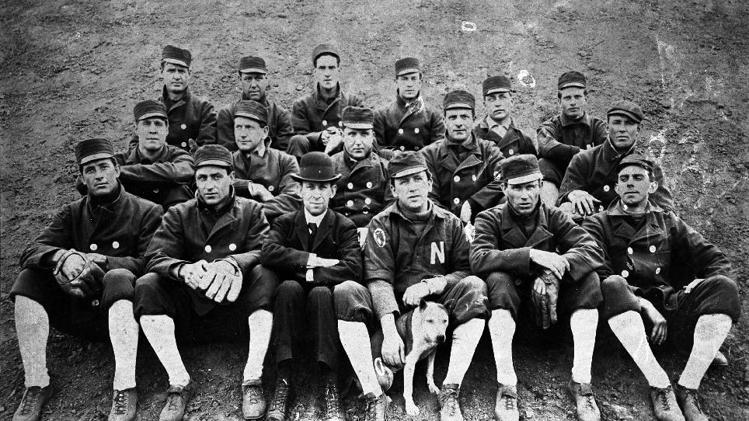
The 1901 Nashville Baseball Club won the first Southern Association pennant.

The team began the regular-season on May 2, 1901, in Chattanooga, Tennessee, at Stanton Field with a 15–14 win over the Chattanooga Lookouts in 10 innings. In the bottom of the tenth with the score tied, 14–14, Nashville's Doc Wiseman drew a walk, stole second base, and came home to score the winning run on Andy O'Connell's hit to right field. The Nashvilles won the next two games in Chattanooga before playing their home opener at Athletic Park on May 6. With over 2,000 spectators in attendance, Nashville lost their inaugural home game versus Chattanooga, 9–7, in 10 innings. They recorded their first home victory the next day, defeating Chattanooga, 4–0, behind the pitching of War Sanders, who allowed only three hits in the complete game shutout. At the conclusion of the season, Nashville stood in first place with the Little Rock Travelers a close second. Following a dispute between the two teams in which each claimed to be the rightful pennant winners, the league's board of directors awarded the first Southern Association pennant to Nashville with a win–loss record of 78–45, one game ahead of Little Rock.

In 1902, the Southern Association was elevated to Class A status. On July 9, Nashville's Bill Dammann pitched the club's first no-hitter against the visiting Shreveport Giants at Athletic Park. The game was called due to rain in the fifth inning with Nashville leading, 8–0. Fisher led the 1902 team to win a second pennant with an 80–40 season, placing six games ahead of the second-place New Orleans Pelicans. From 1903 to 1907, the Nashvilles had losing seasons in all but the 1904 campaign. During this stretch, they posted their all-time lowest winning percentage in 1906, when they went 45–92 (.328).

=== Becoming the Volunteers (1908) ===
In 1908, Nashville American sportswriter Grantland Rice held a contest to name the team. The public was invited to mail-in votes for one of three monikers: the "Limerocks" (from the abundance of limestone in and around Nashville), the "Rocks" (a shorter version of "Limerocks" and a reference to Nashville being called "The Rock City"), and the "Volunteers" (from the state's nickname, "The Volunteer State"). The winner and new official team name was Volunteers, though this was and is often shortened to Vols. Rice also gave Nashville's Athletic Park a new name: Sulphur Dell, a reference to the location's earlier name of Sulphur Springs Bottom due to the presence of an underground sulphur spring at the site.

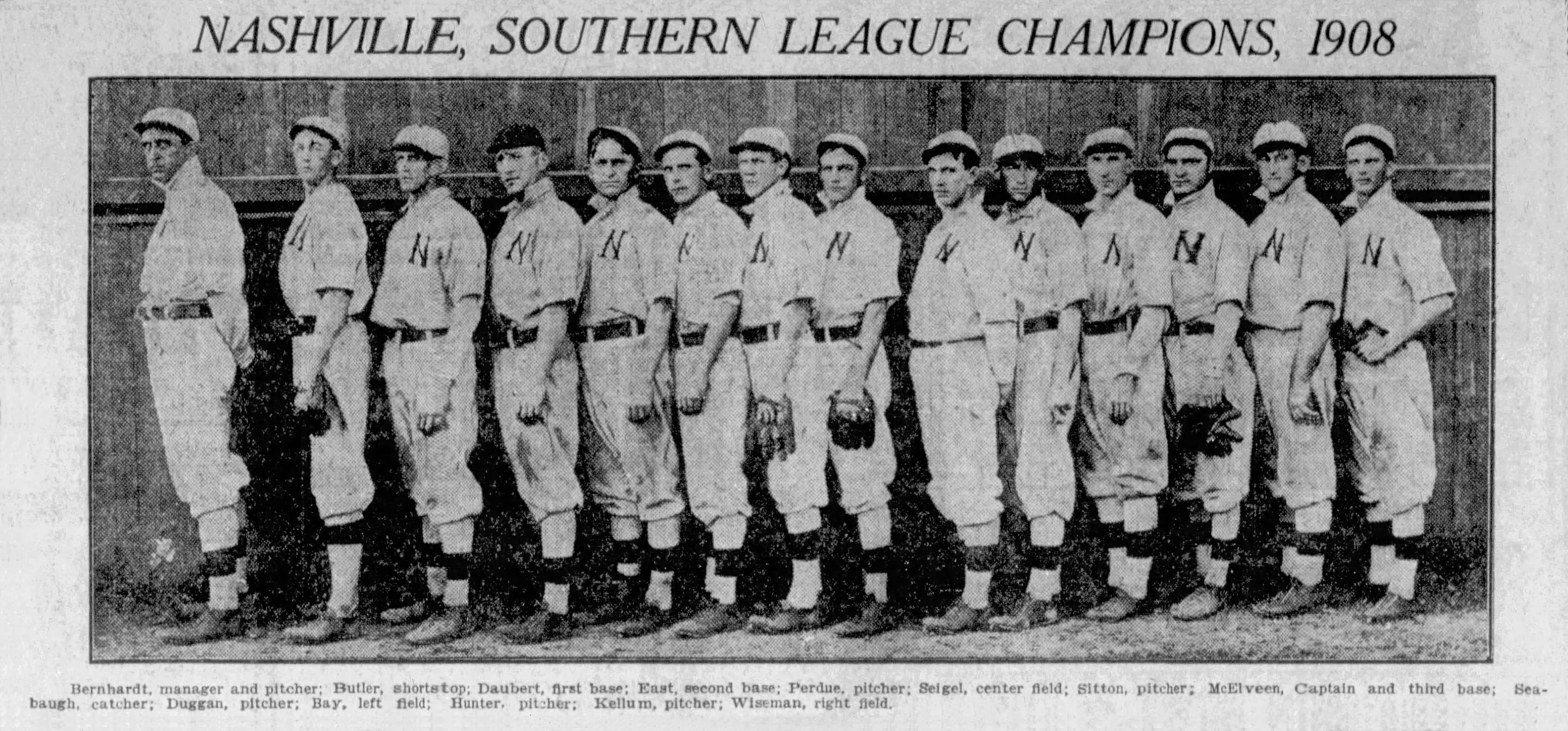
The 1908 Nashville Vols won the Southern Association pennant on the last day of the season.

Nashville's John Duggan tossed the team's second no-hitter on September 10, 1908, in a 1–0 home win over Little Rock. The Vols, under manager Bill Bernhard, entered the final day of the season with the pennant on the line. The championship was to be decided by the last game of the season between Nashville and New Orleans at Sulphur Dell. Both teams had 56 losses, but the Pelicans were in first-place with 76 wins to the Vols' second-place 74. Some 12,000 spectators witnessed Vols pitcher Carl Sitton hurl a three-hit, 1–0 shutout, giving Nashville their third Southern Association pennant with a 75–56 record. Their lone run came in the seventh inning when Doc Wiseman drove in Ed Hurlburt from third base with a sharply-hit bouncer over the second baseman. Rice called it "the greatest game ever played in Dixie." One account recalls, "By one run, by one point, Nashville has won the Southern League pennant, nosing New Orleans out literally by an eyelash. Saturday's game, which was the deciding one, between Nashville and New Orleans was the greatest exhibition of the national game ever seen in the South and the finish in the league race probably sets a record in baseball history."

=== 1909–1933 ===
On August 31, 1909, Vols pitcher Charlie Case threw a 1–0 no-hitter on the road against New Orleans at Pelican Park. The team finished the season in second place, five-and-a-half games behind the pennant-winning Atlanta Crackers. From 1910 through 1915, Nashville finished no higher than fourth and had winning records only in 1911 and 1914.

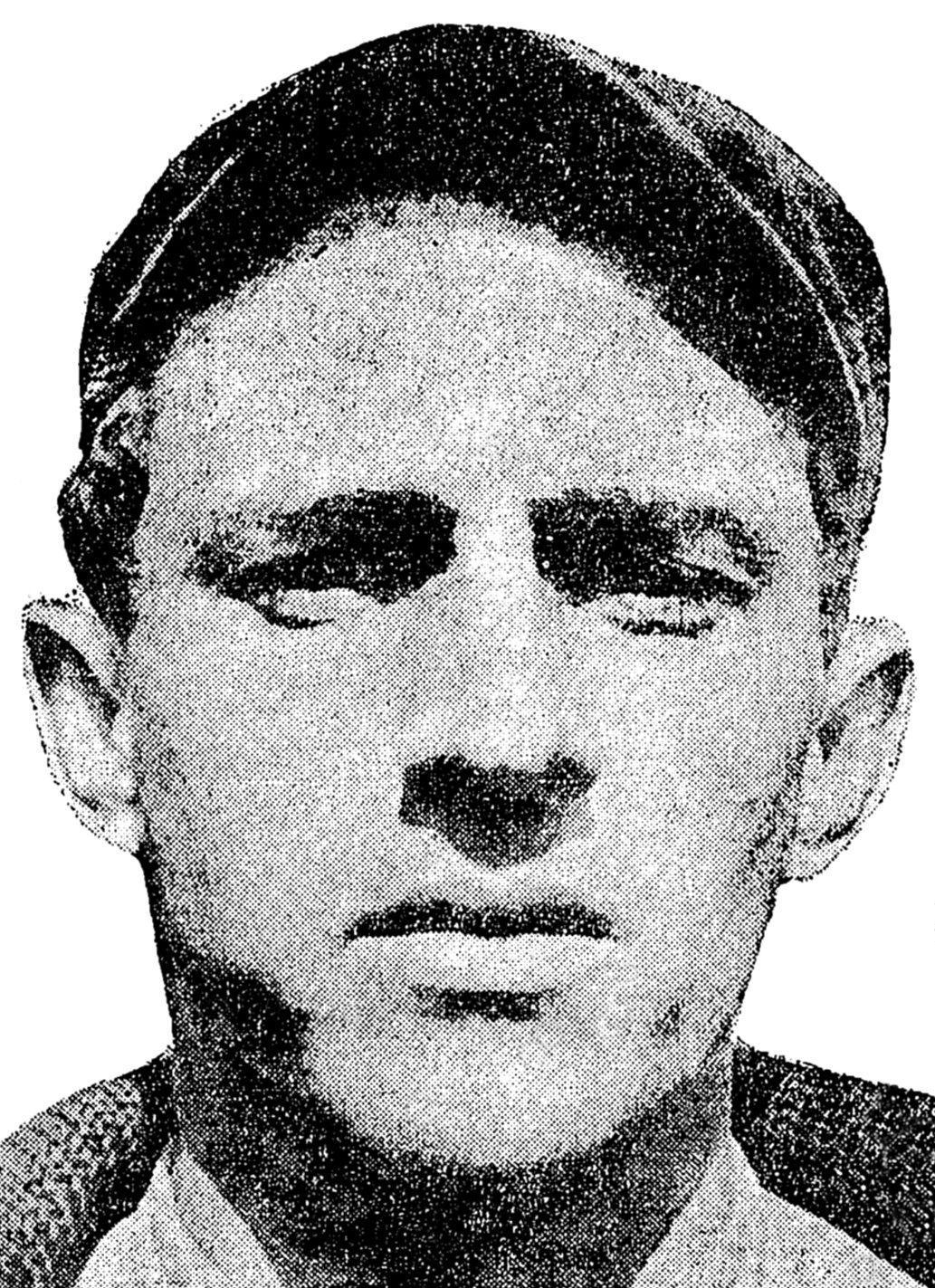
Tom Rogers pitched a perfect game for the Vols at Sulphur Dell on July 11, 1916.

Tom Rogers pitched a perfect game against Chattanooga on July 11, 1916, at Sulphur Dell. He retired all 27 batters in the 2–0 victory—the first perfect game in the Southern Association and the only perfect game in the Volunteers' history. Under the leadership of manager Roy Ellam, the Vols captured their fourth league pennant with an 84–54 record, nine games ahead of second-place New Orleans. Nashville closed out the 1910s by placing fifth at 77–73 in 1917 and incurring losing records in the next two campaigns.

On July 25, 1920, Zeke Lohman tossed a 6–0 no-hit game against Atlanta in the second game of a seven-inning doubleheader in Nashville. The Vols posted an even number of winning and losing seasons in the 1920s. The closest they came to hoisting pennants were in 1925, when they placed third at 81–72, five-and-a-half games behind Atlanta, and in 1929, when they wound up in second place at 90–63, three games behind the Birmingham Barons. Conversely, Nashville finished seventh at 62–90 in 1921, forty-one-and-a-half games behind the Memphis Chickasaws, and seventh in 1922 at 59–96, forty games behind the Mobile Bears. In 1928, the Southern Association tried out a split-season schedule wherein the winners from each half qualified for postseason championship playoffs, but Nashville did not win either half.

Nashville started the 1930s with three losing seasons in a row. The 1931 team incurred a franchise-high 102 losses. That season, the Vols played their first night game at Sulphur Dell on May 18 in front of an estimated 7,000 people. The home team lost to the Mobile Marines, 8–1. This was not the first night game to be played in Nashville. The Nashville Tigers of the original Southern League competed in a night game thirty-seven years earlier on July 6, 1894. It was, however, the city's first official night game, as the Tigers' game was contested as a novelty exhibition. The 1933 Volunteers turned in their first winning record in four seasons. That year, the league utilized a split-season schedule, but Nashville did not capture either half's pennant.

=== New York Giants (1934–1935) ===
The Vols became the Class A affiliate of the National League's New York Giants in 1934. Chuck Dressen managed the team to win the first-half of the season with a 46–26 mark, six games ahead of New Orleans. After being hired to lead the Cincinnati Reds in late July, he was replaced by Vols outfielder Lance Richbourg. Following the conclusion of the regular-season, they met New Orleans, winners of the second-half, in a best-of-five-games series to determine the Southern Association champion but were defeated by New Orleans, 3–2.

The circuit abandoned the split-season format in 1935 and instead adopted the Shaughnessy playoff system in which the top four teams at the end of the season participated in a tournament to determine a champion. The 1935 Vols began the season with Frank Brazill at the helm, but he was dismissed in early June and replaced by Johnny Butler. The team qualified for the playoffs with an 82–69 record, placing fourth, but they were eliminated in the first round by Atlanta, 3–0–1. Perceiving the affiliation with New York to benefit the Giants more than the Volunteers, Nashville discontinued its working agreement after the season.

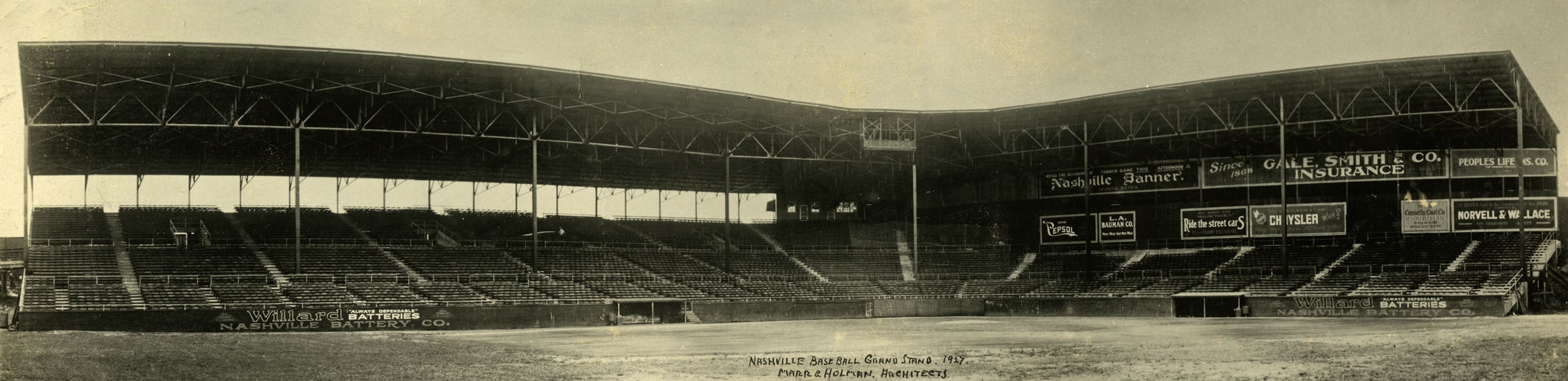
The Sulphur Dell grandstand and infield in 1927

=== Cincinnati Reds (1936–1937) ===
Nashville entered into a new affiliation with the National League's Cincinnati Reds in 1936, enticed by their larger roster of younger players who could help the Vols. The Southern Association was also elevated to Class A1 status at this time. With Lance Richbourg returning to manage in 1936, the Vols posted an 86–65 record, good for second place and postseason berth. After losing the first game of the first round, Nashville won two-in-a-row to take control of the series, but two consecutive losses to Birmingham resulted in a 3–2 elimination. The 1937 team finished fifth, missing the playoffs. The affiliation with Cincinnati came to an end after these two seasons.

=== Brooklyn Dodgers (1938–1940) ===
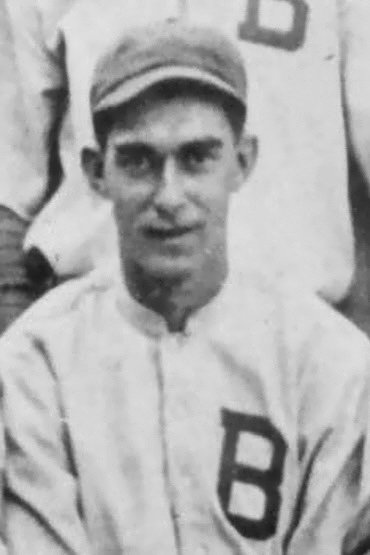
Larry Gilbert led the Vols to win four Southern Association pennants, six playoff championships, and three Dixie Series from 1939 to 1948.

Nashville became the Class A1 affiliate of the National League's Brooklyn Dodgers in 1938. This was the beginning of most successful stretch, in terms of winning percentage and championships, in team history. Managed again by Charlie Dressen, the 1938 Vols placed second at 84–66. They beat New Orleans, 3–2, in the playoffs' opening semifinal series to advance. In the championship round, now a best-of-seven series, they lost to Atlanta, 4–1.

Larry Gilbert became Nashville's manager in 1939. The pennant race that season was exceptionally tight, as the top four finishers were within two games of one another, including Nashville one-and-a-half games back in third place at 85–68. The Vols swept the Memphis Chicks, 3–0, in the opening round, and they then bested Atlanta, 4–3, to win their first playoff championship. This was the first of six consecutive playoff titles for the Volunteers. Since 1920, the champions of the Southern Association had been meeting the champions of the Texas League in the Dixie Series, a best-of-seven series to crown a champion of the Southland. Up three games to two, the Vols lost two-in-a-row versus the Texas League champion Fort Worth Cats to lose the series, 4–3.

The 1940 Volunteers set a franchise record with their 101–47 (.682) season under Gilbert. In possession of first place since Opening Day, they won their fifth Southern Association pennant by nine-and-a-half games over Atlanta. After blanking Chattanooga, 3–0, in the semifinals, they won a second playoff title over Atlanta, 4–2. Nashville then won their first Dixie Series title versus the Houston Buffaloes, 4–1. The Vols led the loop in batting average (.311), hits (1,662), doubles (344), home runs (89), runs (961), double plays (208), and fielding percentage (.970). Nashville's Arnie Moser paced the league with 216 hits, John Mihalic drew a league-best 127 walks, and Gus Dugas tied for the lead with 22 home runs. On the pitching side, Boots Poffenberger posted a league-best 26 wins. Catcher Greek George, who had a .335 batting average with 109 runs batted in (RBI) and a fielding percentage of .998 with only 1 error in 612 total chances and 2 passed balls, was selected for the Southern Association Most Valuable Player (MVP) Award. In a 2001 ranking, the 1940 Vols were evaluated as the 47th greatest minor league team of all time. The affiliation with Brooklyn was not extended beyond 1940.

=== Unaffiliated (1941–1942) ===
The Volunteers operated without a major league working agreement in 1941. With Larry Gilbert remaining as manager, the team placed second at 83–70, fifteen-and-a-half games behind Atlanta. In the playoffs, they defeated New Orleans, 3–1, before capturing their third Southern Association championship over Atlanta, 4–3. In the deciding game, the Vols trailed 2–0 before tieing the contest in the ninth inning, and George Jeffcoat scored the winning run in the tenth. Nashville then won a second-straight Dixie Series, sweeping the Dallas Rebels, 4–0.

The 1942 campaign, in which the Vols were also unaffiliated, was equally successful as the previous season. Gilbert's team posted an 85–66 record, placing four-and-a-half games behind Little Rock. After downing Birmingham, 3–1, in the semifinals, they won a fourth championship by sweeping Little Rock, 4–0. Against the Texas League's Shreveport Sports, Nashville won a third consecutive Dixie Series title, 4–2.

=== Chicago Cubs (1943–1951) ===
In 1943, the Volunteers became the Class A1 affiliate of the National League's Chicago Cubs. Still under Larry Gilbert, the Vols won the first-half of the season with a 49–26 record, nine-and-a-half games ahead of Little Rock, and later clinched their sixth regular-season pennant with a league-best 83–55 record, four games in front of New Orleans. In an abbreviated postseason, the Vols won their fifth consecutive Southern Association playoff title over second-half winners New Orleans, 4–1. There would be no Dixie Series appearance since the series was suspended due to World War II. Outfielder Ed Sauer, the league leader in batting average (.368), doubles (51), runs (113), and stolen bases (30), was chosen for the MVP Award.

The 1944 Vols posted an overall record of 79–61, placing third, but won the second-half title in the process, going 47–25, one game ahead of Atlanta. They won their sixth consecutive playoff championship by defeating first-half pennant winners Memphis, 4–3, after coming back from a 3–1 series deficit. The Dixie Series was still on wartime hiatus.

For the first time since 1937, Nashville failed to qualify for the postseason from 1945 to 1946, having finished with losing records well behind the leaders. In 1946, the Southern Association was reclassified as a Double-A circuit. The 1947 team placed third at 80–73, fourteen games behind the Mobile Bears. Having returned to a four-team postseason format, the Vols won their semifinal bout with New Orleans, 4–1, but were defeated for the league championship by Mobile, 4–2.

In 1948, Nashville won a seventh regular-season pennant by three games over Memphis at 95–58. They reached the championship round via a semifinal win over Mobile, 4–3, but, for a second-straight season, lost in the finals, this time to Birmingham, 4–2. Vols outfielder Chuck Workman, who paced the league in home runs (52) and RBI (182), won the MVP Award. After 10 seasons as manager, Larry Gilbert retired from his post following the season but remained with the team in the role of general manager. Gilbert had led the Vols for 1,471 games over 10 seasons, making him the longest-tenured manager in team history. He also sits atop the all-time wins list for Vols skippers with 821 wins.

Rollie Hemsley, Gilbert's successor, managed the 1949 squad to win their eighth league flag with a first-place 95–57 season, four-and-a-half games over Birmingham. Nashville advanced past New Orleans, 4–2, in the semifinals and then won their seventh playoff championship versus Mobile, 4–2. They capped off the season with a 4–3 Dixie Series victory over the Texas League's Tulsa Oilers. Catcher Carl Sawatski, who led the circuit with 45 home runs and 153 RBI, won league MVP honors.

The 1950 Vols, under manager Don Osborn placed third at 86–64, five-and-a-half back from Atlanta. They won the semifinals versus Birmingham, 4–1, and then beat Atlanta, 4–1, to win an eighth playoff title. They lost the Dixie Series to the San Antonio Missions, 4–3. Pitcher Bob Schultz, with a league-best 25 wins and 5 shutouts and a second-best 202 strikeouts, won the loop's MVP Award. On July 21, 1951, Umberto Flammini tossed a 2–0 no-hit game against Atlanta on the road at Ponce de Leon Park. The 1951 team narrowly missed the playoffs with a fifth-place finish. A shortage of available players prompted Nashville to discontinue their working agreement with the Chicago Cubs after the 1951 season.

=== New York Giants (1952–1954) ===
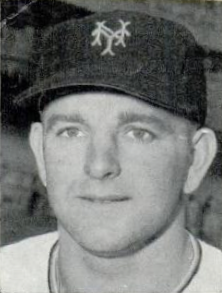
Bob Lennon led the Southern Association in batting average, hits, runs, home runs, and RBI and was given the Southern Association MVP Award in 1954.

The Vols returned to the New York Giants organization as their Double-A affiliate in 1952. While the 1952 team finished fifth with a losing record and missed the playoffs, the 1953 club, led by Hugh Poland, finished in second place, two games behind Chattanooga, at 85–69. After defeating Atlanta, 4–2, in the semifinals, they won what would be Nashville's ninth and final Southern Association championship over Birmingham, 4–1. In their last of seven Dixie Series appearances, they lost to the Dallas Eagles, 4–2. Twenty-three game winner Jack Harshman was the league's MVP.

Despite the 1954 team ending the season 30 games out of first-place behind Atlanta, outfielder Bob Lennon led the league in several areas, including batting average (.345), hits (210), runs (139), home runs (64), and RBI (161), and was chosen as the Southern Association MVP. With the New York Giants unable to supply Nashville with quality players and the Vols losing some US$40,000 to $50,000 per season amid dwindling attendance, they severed ties with the Giants after the 1954 campaign.

=== Cincinnati Reds (1955–1960) ===
Nashville repartnered with the Cincinnati Reds, who were known as the Cincinnati Redlegs at the time, in 1955. Whereas New York owned their Triple-A affiliate and supplied them with better players than Double-A Nashville, Cincinnati only had a working agreement with their Triple-A club and could amply supply the Vols with players. The affiliation, however, resulted in little success. The 1955 Vols finished a half game behind the playoff qualifiers in fifth place at 77–74, while the 1956 team placed a more distant seventh at 75–79, five-and-a-half back.

In 1957, the Vols posted a third-place 83–69 record, coming in three games behind first-place Atlanta. Though Nashville won the semifinals against Memphis, 4–2, they were swept in the championship round by Atlanta, 4–0, in what was to be their final postseason appearance. Outfielder Stan Palys, who paced the league with a .359 batting average and 116 runs along with a second-best 112 RBI and 93 walks, was selected for the Southern Association MVP Award. The 1958 Vols finished two games shy of a winning record and one-and-a-half games behind the playoff qualifiers in fifth place at 76–78. Pitcher Jim O'Toole won the Rookie of the Year Award with a league-high 20 wins, 189 strikeouts, and a 2.44 earned run average.

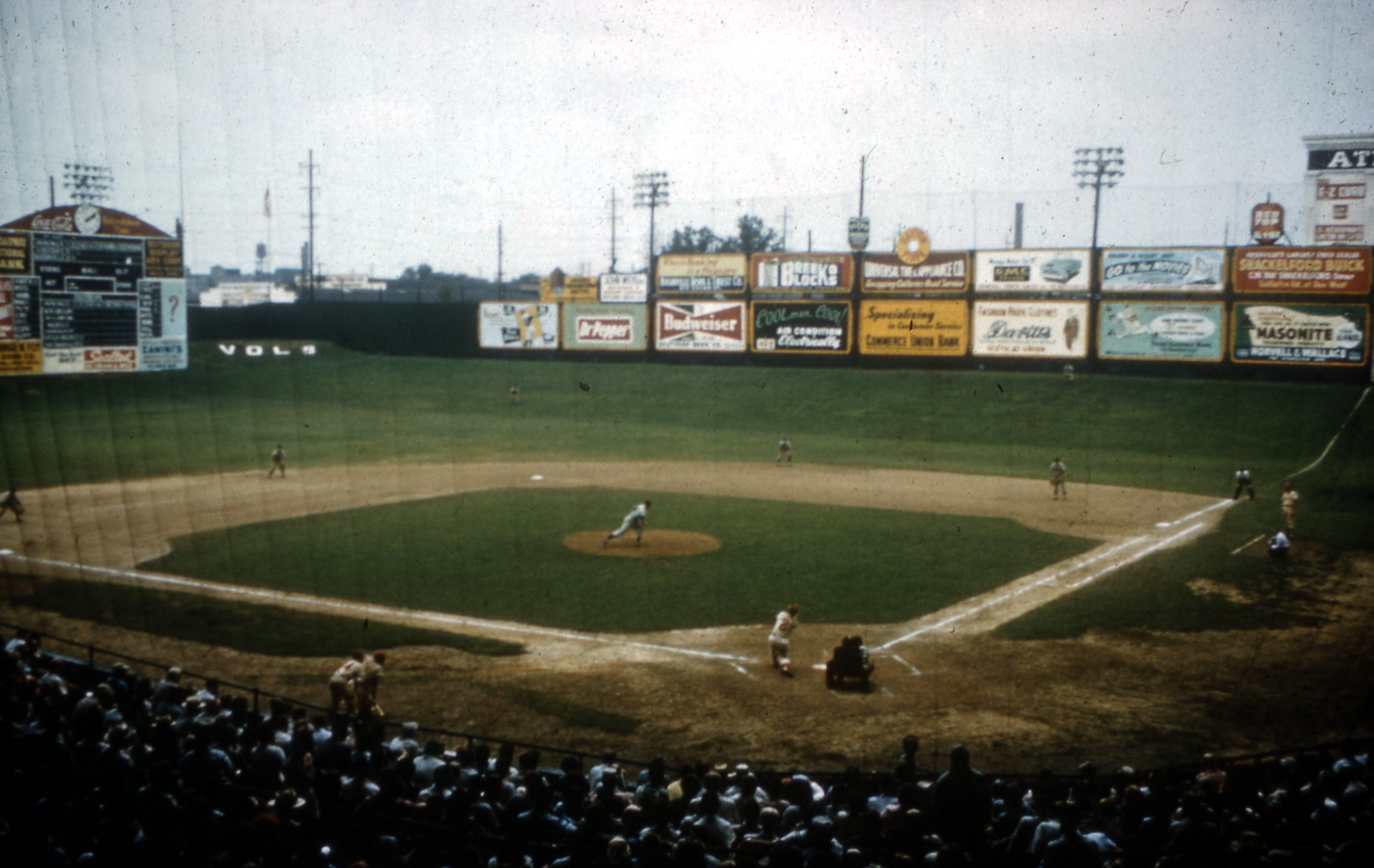
A game at Sulphur Dell (c. 1950s–1960s)

Since 1955, the team had been operated by owner T. L. Murray. He had been losing money each year, including a loss of $50,000 in 1958, as attendance dwindled. Having reached a point where he could no longer afford to run the Volunteers, Murray offered to sell the team, Sulphur Dell, and the real estate it occupied for $200,000 to a local citizens group, which would operate the club beginning in 1959. A committee was formed with the goal of raising $250,000 through the sale of 50,000 shares of stock at $5 per share with a deadline of January 7, 1959. The additional $50,000 would be used for operating expenses. Known as Vols, Inc., the group was headed by president Herschel Lynn Greer, a local businessman, and included county musician Eddy Arnold, Tennessee Secretary of State Joe C. Carr, and Vols manager Dick Sisler. The funds were raised by 4,867 investors to keep the team in Nashville.

In 1959, the loop switched back to a split-season schedule. The Vols narrowly missed the first-half pennant by a half game behind Birmingham at 41–24. They placed further back in the second-half and missed the playoffs while posting an overall third-place record of 84–64. Though the circuit returned to a four-team playoff in 1960, Nashville came in sixth at 71–82, twelve games behind the qualifiers.

Cincinnati ended its affiliation with Nashville after the 1960 season because the Southern Association prohibited the use of black players. The league was the only professional circuit that had not integrated, and it had a few member clubs that operated in cities with segregation laws that banned black players or mixed-race athletic competitions.

=== Minnesota Twins (1961) ===
Having a difficult time obtaining a new major league affiliate, the Vols' board of directors considered operating the club without an affiliate, leasing Sulphur Dell to another party at which to base a team, sitting out the 1961 season, or surrendering the franchise to the league and selling the ballpark. They continued to seek a major league working agreement and found one with the American League's Minnesota Twins. The partnership came about through the help of Southern Association president Hal Totten, Chattanooga president Joe Engel, and Birmingham general manager Eddie Glennon, who convinced Twins president Calvin Griffith and farm director Sherry Robertson to affiliate with Nashville. On the field, the Vols went 69–83 with a sixth-place finish, 21 games behind Chattanooga. The season finale was a 10-inning 4–2 loss to Little Rock at Sulphur Dell on September 4. Minnesota ended its partial working agreement with Nashville after the season.

=== Hiatus (1962) ===
Knowing the Vols were unlikely to gain another major league affiliate otherwise, the board of directors approved the use of black players beginning in 1962. The Southern Association eventually followed suit. Nashville then gained a working agreement with the American League's Detroit Tigers. The league planned to operate as a reduced six-team circuit in 1962 following the subtraction of the Atlanta, Birmingham, Mobile, and Shreveport franchises and the addition of teams in Columbus, Georgia, and Evansville, Indiana. However, the inability of the Columbus and Macon teams to secure major league affiliations resulted in the Southern Association disbanding after 61 seasons.

Nashville and Chattanooga were invited to join the Class A South Atlantic League (often referred to as the Sally League) if they could get major league affiliations. Detroit was unable to honor their previous agreement to partner with the Vols since they already had a Sally League affiliate. When the Philadelphia Phillies refused to partner with Chattanooga in the loop, minor league president George Trautman ceased his efforts to locate an affiliate for Nashville. The Vols did not take the field in 1962. Instead, Sulphur Dell played host to Negro league, collegiate, and amateur baseball games, as well as other events such as concerts, rodeos, professional wrestling, and revivals.

In August 1962, Nashville's board of directors voted to proceed with a plan presented by South Atlantic League president Sam Smith that would see Nashville join the league in 1963. The committee agreed that a major league affiliation and league membership must be obtained by January 1, 1963, or they would sell Sulphur Dell.

=== Los Angeles Angels (1963) ===
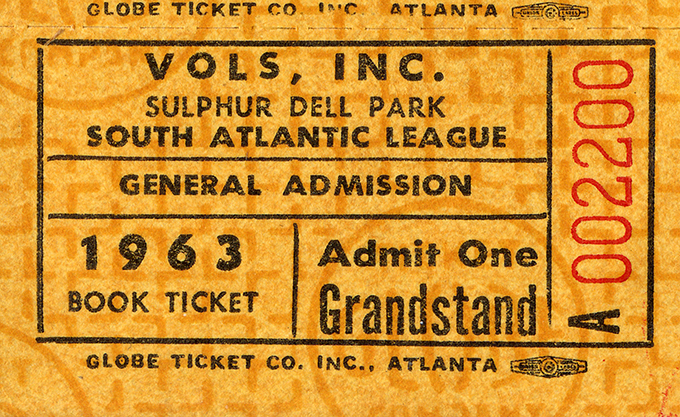
A ticket from the Vols' final season in 1963

Nashville's Vols played their final season in 1963 as the Double-A affiliate of the American League's Los Angeles Angels in the South Atlantic League. They began competition in the circuit on April 19 with an 8–4 victory over the Knoxville Smokies on the road at Smithson Stadium in Knoxville, Tennessee. The Sulphur Dell home opener on April 22 saw the Macon Peaches down the Vols, 15–4, with 8,348 spectators in attendance. Their first home victory came on April 25 with a 12–4 win against the Charlotte Hornets. On July 17, Edward Kikla pitched an 8–0 no-hitter in the first game of a seven-inning doubleheader against the Augusta Yankees on the road at Jennings Stadium. The Volunteers closed out the season on September 8 with a pair of victories by winning both games of a double bill over the Lynchburg White Sox, 6–3 and 2–1, at Sulphur Dell. Nashville placed last out of eight teams at 53–86, twenty-seven-and-a-half games out of first and did not with either half of the Sally League's split-season.

Poor attendance and financial problems, including no cash assets and a nearly $22,000 debt incurred over the season, resulted in the team's board of directors voting unanimously to surrender the franchise to the league on September 16.

=== After the Vols ===
Amateur baseball teams took the field at Sulphur Dell in 1964. The park was converted to a speedway for three weeks in 1965. It later became the city's tow-in lot and was used for storage by an automobile company. Sulphur Dell was demolished on April 16, 1969, after being purchased by an investor with the intent of building an 18-story shopping center. The plan fell apart, and the property was subdivided into 22 parcels and put up for auction in 1971. Meeting with little success, the land was sold to a group of investors in 1972, who gradually filled in the property with dirt and rock but had no plans to develop. Much of the area was bought by the State of Tennessee and used as parking lots for state employees.

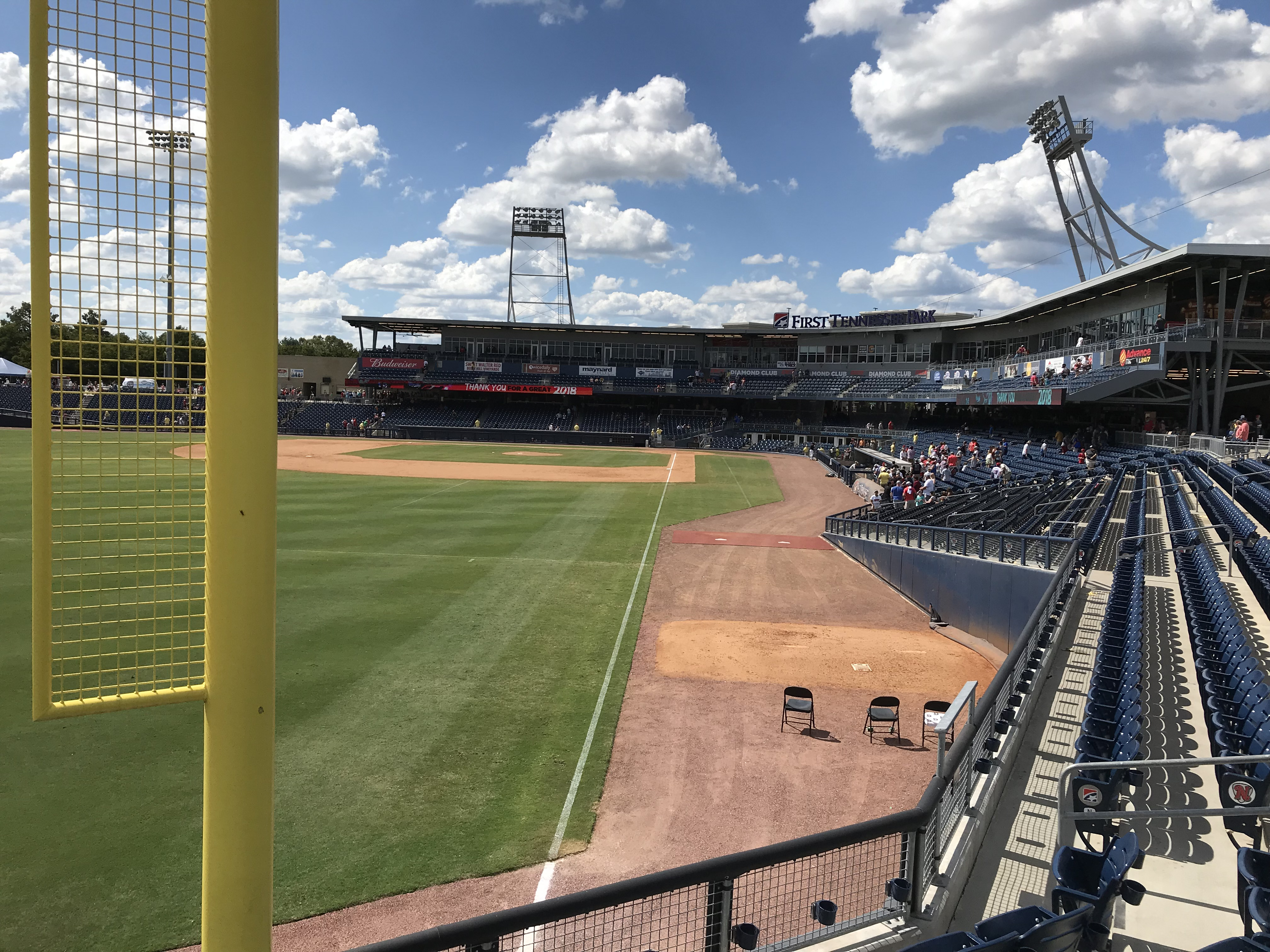
First Horizon Park, home of the Nashville Sounds, was built on the site of Sulphur Dell in 2015.

Music City was without a professional baseball team for 14 years until 1978 when Vanderbilt University baseball coach Larry Schmittou led a group of local investors to found the Nashville Sounds, an expansion franchise of the Double-A Southern League, which was a reorganized version of the South Atlantic League. The Sounds played at Herschel Greer Stadium, named for first Vols, Inc., president Hershel Lynn Greer, for 37 seasons until moving into the new First Horizon Park, which was built on the Sulphur Dell site, in 2015. The ballpark's design incorporates elements relating to Sulphur Dell. Light stanchions on the grandstand and outfield concourse resemble Sulphur Dell's lights. The back of the batter's eye has a tin sign marking the former location of Sulphur Dell's marquee declaring, "Site of Sulphur Dell, Baseball's Most Historic Park, 1870–1963". A plaque on the first base concourse marks the final location of Sulphur Dell's home plate. Displays about Sulphur Dell and the Vols are located throughout the park.

== Season-by-season records ==
Over 9,015 regular-season games in their 62-year history, the Vols compiled a win–loss record of 4,569–4,446 (.507). They qualified for postseason playoffs on 16 occasions and had a postseason record of 108–74–1 (.593). Nashville won eight Southern Association (SA) pennants, nine SA playoff championships, and four Dixie Series titles. Combining all 9,198 regular-season and postseason games, the Vols had an all-time record of 4,677–4,520–1 (.509). The team's best season record occurred in 1940 when they finished 101–47 (.682). Their lowest season record was 45–92 (.328) in 1906. Of the six major league affiliations in Nashville's history, the team experienced its best record from 1938 to 1940 as a Brooklyn Dodgers affiliate. They had a composite season record of 270–181 (.599) and reached the postseason in all three years, winning one pennant, two playoff championships, and one Dixie Series. Including a postseason mark of 25–16 (.610), their overall record was 295–197 (.600). Conversely, the team's lowest record was as a Los Angeles Angels affiliate in 1963. The Vols incurred a 53–86 (.381) record and did not reach the postseason in their lone year with the Angles and their final year of competition.

Nashville Vols' top 10 seasons by winning percentage
Season	League	Regular-season				Postseason			MLB affiliate	Ref.
Season	League	Record	Win %	Finish	GB	Record	Win %	Result	MLB affiliate	Ref.
1940	SA	101–47	.682	1st	—	11–3	.786	Won SA pennant Won semifinals vs. Chattanooga Lookouts, 3–0; Won SA championship vs. Atlanta Crackers, 4–2; Won Dixie Series vs. Houston Buffaloes, 4–1	Brooklyn Dodgers	
1902	SA	80–40	.667	1st	—	—	—	Won SA pennant	Unaffiliated	
1901	SA	78–45	.634	1st	—	—	—	Won SA pennant	Unaffiliated	
1949	SA	95–57	.625	1st	—	12–7	.632	Won SA pennant Won semifinals vs. New Orleans Pelicans, 4–2; Won SA championship vs. Mobile Bears, 4–2; Won Dixie Series vs. Tulsa Oilers, 4–3	Chicago Cubs	
1948	SA	95–58	.621	1st	—	6–7	.462	Won SA pennant Won semifinals vs. Mobile Bears, 4–3; Lost SA championship vs. Birmingham Barons, 4–2	Chicago Cubs	
1916	SA	84–54	.609	1st	—	—	—	Won SA pennant	Unaffiliated	
1943	SA	83–55	.601	1st	—	4–1	.800	Won first-half title Won SA pennant Won SA championship vs. New Orleans Pelicans, 4–1	Chicago Cubs	
1909	SA	82–55	.599	2nd	5 1/2	—	—	—	Unaffiliated	
1929	SA	90–63	.588	2nd	3	—	—	—	Unaffiliated	
1908	SA	75–56	.573	1st	—	—	—	Won SA pennant	Unaffiliated	

== Ballpark ==
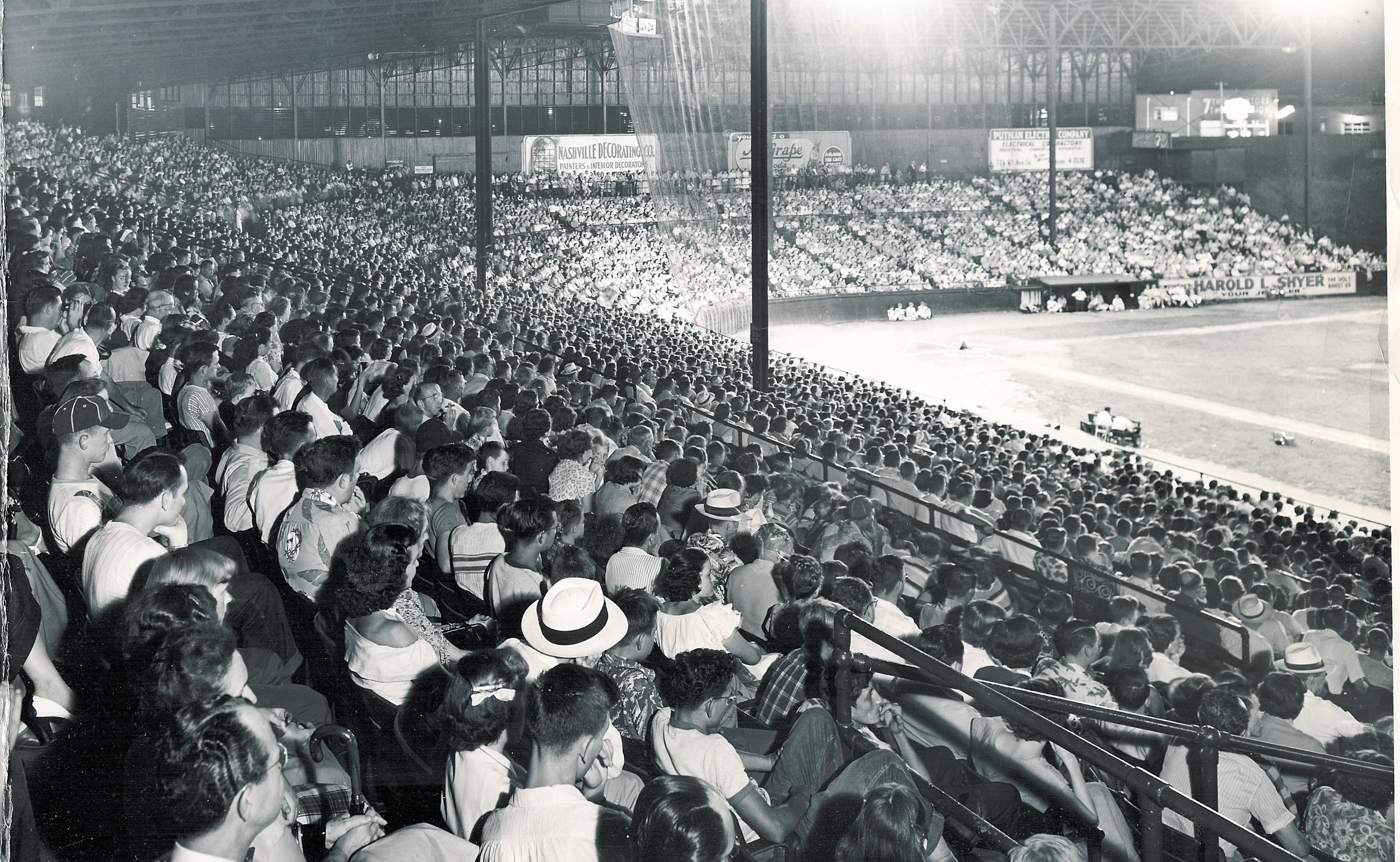
Sulphur Dell (c. 1950s)

The Vols played their home games at Nashville's Athletic Park, which became known as Sulphur Dell in 1908. The first wooden grandstand was built at the northeastern corner of the block bounded by modern-day Junior Gilliam Way, Fourth Avenue North, Harrison Street, and Fifth Avenue North to accommodate fans of the Nashville Americans in 1885. Located in Sulphur Springs Bottom, north of the Tennessee State Capitol building, the land had hitherto been little more than solely a baseball field and required improvements to make it suitable for professional teams. Prior to the Nashville Baseball Club's inaugural 1901 season, the grandstand was remodeled to include 1,000 seats on cushioned benches plus bleachers on both ends with room for an additional 1,200 spectators, which brought the total seating capacity to 2,200 people. A new grandstand was built in 1908, and the old right field bleachers were torn out and a new grandstand erected in their place in 1921.

Home plate was originally situated in the northeast corner of the plot, facing southwest. Consequently, batters, first baseman, and right fielders would often have to compete with the afternoon sunlight shining in their eyes. After the 1926 season, the entire ballpark was demolished and rebuilt as a concrete-and-steel structure with home plate on the west side, facing northeast. Sulphur Dell's infamous outfield was born out of this realignment. The new distances to the park's outfield walls were 334 feet (102 m) to left field, 421 feet (128 m) to center, and 262 feet (80 m) to right. Even with such a short distance to right field, the ballpark had a significant "terrace" or sloping outfield: a steep 25-foot (7.6 m) incline that ran along the entire outfield wall, most dramatically in right and center fields at a 45-degree angle. The top of the right field terrace was 22 1/2 feet (6.9 m) above the infield. Right fielders were often called "mountain goats" for the way they had to go up and down the hills in right-center and right. They usually played on the 10-foot-wide (3.0 m) "shelf" one-third of the way up the incline. Occasionally, the shelf was used for overflow seating, cutting the already-short right field distance to 235 feet (72 m). The seating capacity of the reconfigured stadium was 7,500.

After the Vols' disbanded following the 1963 season, Sulphur Dell saw use as an amateur baseball park, speedway, the city's tow-in lot, and an automobile company's storage lot until being demolished on April 16, 1969. The property largely sat empty, in use as a state-owned employee parking lot, until 2014 when ground was broken on First Horizon Park, the home stadium of the Nashville Sounds minor league baseball team, which moved into the facility in 2015.

== Players ==
After 62 seasons, over 1,200 players had competed in at least one game for the Vols. From these, Nashville Banner sportswriters Fred Russell and George K. Leonard created two rosters of the all-time greatest players, covering the periods of 1901 to 1919 and 1920 to 1963.

All-time Vols (1901–1919)
Position	Player
First baseman	Jake Daubert
Second baseman	Ed Abbaticchio
Shortstop	Kid Butler
Third baseman	Art Kores
Outfielder	Tod Sloan
Outfielder	Gus Williams
Outfielder	Doc Wiseman
Catcher	Newt Fisher
Catcher	Gabby Street
Pitcher	Pug Cavet
Pitcher	Hugh Hill
Pitcher	Hub Perdue
Pitcher	Tom Rogers
Pitcher	War Sanders
Pitcher	Carl Sitton

All-time Vols (1920–1963)
Position	Fred Russell	George K. Leonard
Position	Player	Player
First baseman	Les Fleming	Les Fleming
Second baseman	John Mihalic	John Mihalic
Shortstop	Lonny Frey	Woody Williams
Third baseman	Charlie English	Rance Pless
Outfielder	Kiki Cuyler	Babe Barna
Outfielder	Phil Weintraub	Kiki Cuyler
Catcher	Greek George	Smoky Burgess
Catcher	Carl Sawatski	Carl Sawatski
Right-handed pitcher	Tiny Chaplin	Red Lucas
Right-handed pitcher	Red Lucas	Pete Mallory
Right-handed pitcher	Jim Maloney	Jim Maloney
Right-handed pitcher	Boots Poffenberger	Boots Poffenberger
Left-handed pitcher	Jim O'Toole	Jack Harshman
Left-handed pitcher	Bob Schultz	Jim O'Toole
Left-handed pitcher	Boyd Tepler	Bob Schultz
Manager	Larry Gilbert	Larry Gilbert

== Achievements ==
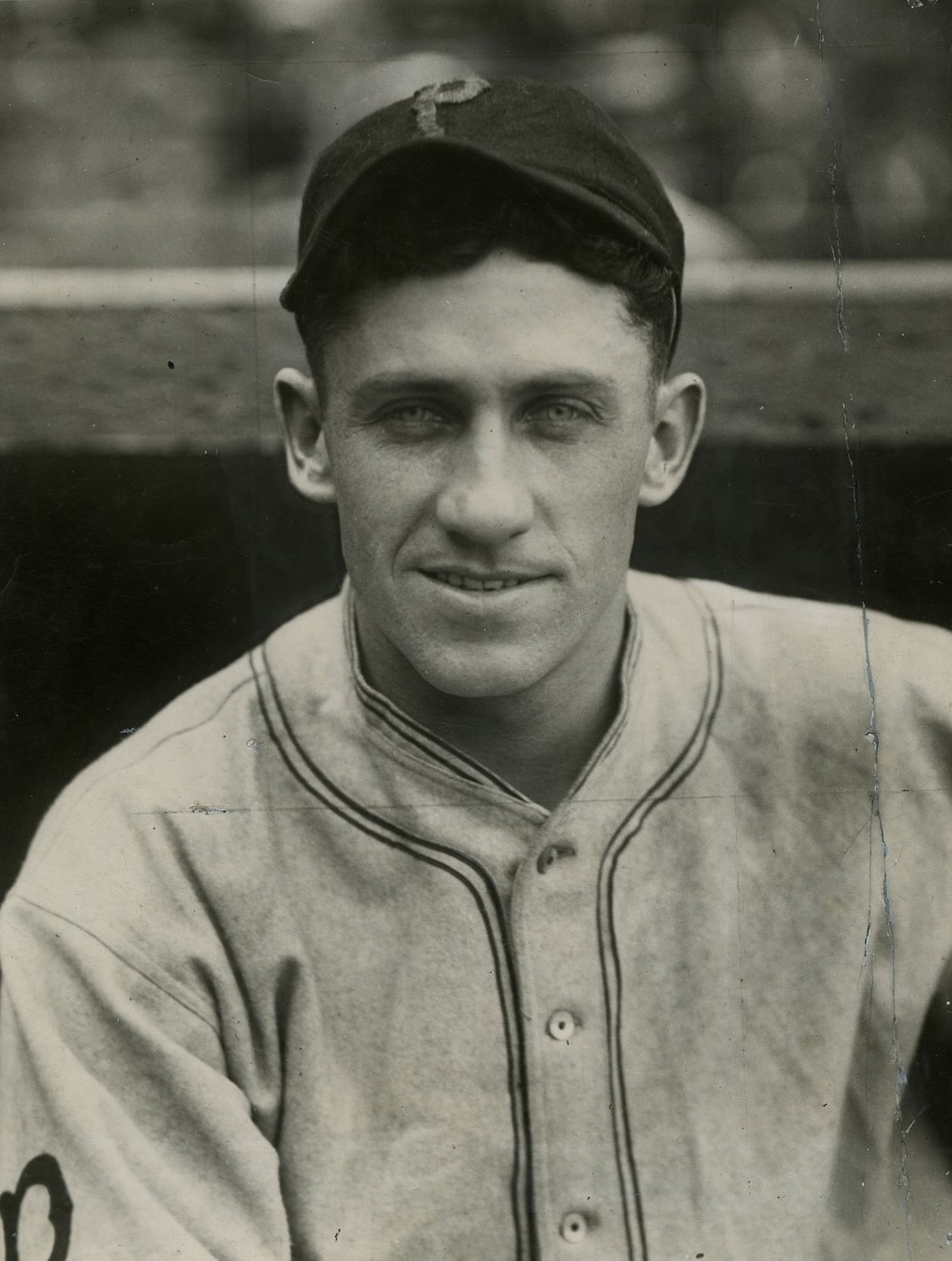
Kiki Cuyler (1923) was inducted in the National Baseball Hall of Fame in 1968.

=== Awards ===
Eight Vols were selected for the Southern Association Most Valuable Player Award, more than any other team in the league, in recognition for their performance with Nashville. These players were Greek George (1940), Ed Sauer (1943), Chuck Workman (1948), Carl Sawatski (1949), Bob Schultz (1950), Jack Harshman (1953), Bob Lennon (1954), and Stan Palys (1957). One player won the league's Rookie of the Year Award: Jim O'Toole (1958).

=== Hall of Famers ===
Two former Vols have been elected to the National Baseball Hall of Fame. Outfielder Kiki Cuyler, who was selected by the Veterans Committee in 1968, played for the Vols in 1923 before being purchased by the Pittsburgh Pirates near the season's end. In 149 games, Cuyler led the team with a .340 batting average, 195 hits, 39 doubles, and 17 triples. Pitcher Waite Hoyt, selected by the Veterans Committee in 1969, was on loan to Nashville from the New York Giants in 1918 when he was recalled to the majors mid-season. In 20 games, he had accumulated a win–loss record of 5–10 with 51 strikeouts.

== Managers ==
Over the course of 62 seasons, the Nashville Vols were led by 28 managers. Playing in an era when it was common to have player-managers, 19 men served as managers concurrent with their on-field playing. The team's eight regular-season pennants, nine playoff championships, and four Dixie Series titles were won behind seven different managers. Newt Fisher (1901 and 1902), Bill Bernhard (1908), Roy Ellam (1916), and Larry Gilbert (1940, 1943, 1948, and 1949) managed the Vols to win the Southern Association pennant. Gilbert (1939, 1940, 1941, 1942, 1943, and 1944), Rollie Hemsley (1949), Don Osborn (1950), and Hugh Poland (1953) led the team to win Southern Association playoff championships. Gilbert (1940, 1941, and 1942) and Hemsley (1949) managed Nashville to win the Dixie Series, a best-of-seven playoff series against the champions of the Texas League.

Nashville Vols' top 10 managers by games managed
Manager	Season(s)	Regular-season				Postseason				Composite				Ref(s).
Manager	Season(s)	G	W	L	Win %	Apps.	W	L	Win %	G	W	L	Win %	Ref(s).
Larry Gilbert	1939–1948	1,481	821	660	.554	8	63	33	.656	1,577	884	693	.561	
Jimmy Hamilton	1923–1928	863	443	420	.513	—	—	—	—	863	443	420	.513	
Bill Schwartz	1911–1915	710	350	360	.493	—	—	—	—	710	350	360	.493	
Roy Ellam	1916–1920	650	311	339	.478	—	—	—	—	650	311	339	.478	
Newt Fisher	1901–1905	574	313	261	.545	—	—	—	—	574	313	261	.545	
Chuck Dressen	1932–1934, 1938	471	261	210	.554	1	4	6	.400	481	265	216	.551	
Hugh Poland	1952–1954	460	222	238	.483	1	10	7	.588	477	232	245	.486	
Dick Sisler	1957–1959	454	243	211	.535	1	4	6	.400	464	247	217	.532	
Bill Bernhard	1908–1910	408	221	187	.542	—	—	—	—	408	221	187	.542	
Lance Richbourg	1934, 1935, 1936–1937	359	193	166	.538	2	4	6	.400	369	197	172	.534	

== See also ==
- Nashville Vols presidents
- History of professional baseball in Nashville, Tennessee
