= Hugh Poland (baseball) =

American baseball player (1910–1984)

- Catcher
- Born: January 10, 1910; Tompkinsville, Kentucky, U.S.
- Died: March 29, 1984 (aged 74); Guthrie, Kentucky, U.S.
- Batted: Left Threw: Right

MLB debut
- April 22, 1943, for the New York Giants

Last MLB appearance
- May 18, 1948, for the Cincinnati Reds

MLB statistics
- Batting average: .185
- Home runs: 0
- Runs batted in: 19
- Stats at Baseball Reference

Teams
- New York Giants (1943); Boston Braves (1943–1944, 1946); Philadelphia Phillies (1947); Cincinnati Reds (1947–1948)

Hugh Reid Poland (January 19, 1910 – March 29, 1984) was an American professional baseball catcher, manager and scout. A native of Tompkinsville, Kentucky, he attended Western Kentucky University. Poland threw right-handed, batted left-handed, and stood 6 ft (1.8 m) tall, weighing 185 lb (84 kg).

Poland's baseball career began in the St. Louis Cardinals' far-flung farm system of the 1930s. He eventually reached the highest minor-league level (then Double-A), but his Major League Baseball debut did not occur until 1943, when at age 33 Poland appeared in a New York Giants uniform on April 22. He was traded five days and four games later to the Boston Braves, with infielder Connie Ryan, in exchange for future Baseball Hall of Fame catcher Ernie Lombardi. But, unlike Lombardi, Poland was exclusively a reserve catcher during his MLB career. He appeared in all or parts of five seasons (1943–44; 1946–48), for the Giants, Braves, Philadelphia Phillies and Cincinnati Reds, batting a meek .185 with no home runs and 19 runs batted in in 83 games played.

Poland's minor league managerial career preceded his MLB service when, at age 30, he skipped the Cardinals' Cambridge Canners affiliate in the Class D Eastern Shore League in 1940. In 1949, he rejoined the Giants and managed in their farm system through 1954, including service with the Triple-A Ottawa Giants and the Double-A Nashville Vols. He then scouted for the Giants' franchise until his death, at age 74, in Guthrie, Kentucky.
