= Tom Rogers (baseball) =

American baseball player (1892–1936)

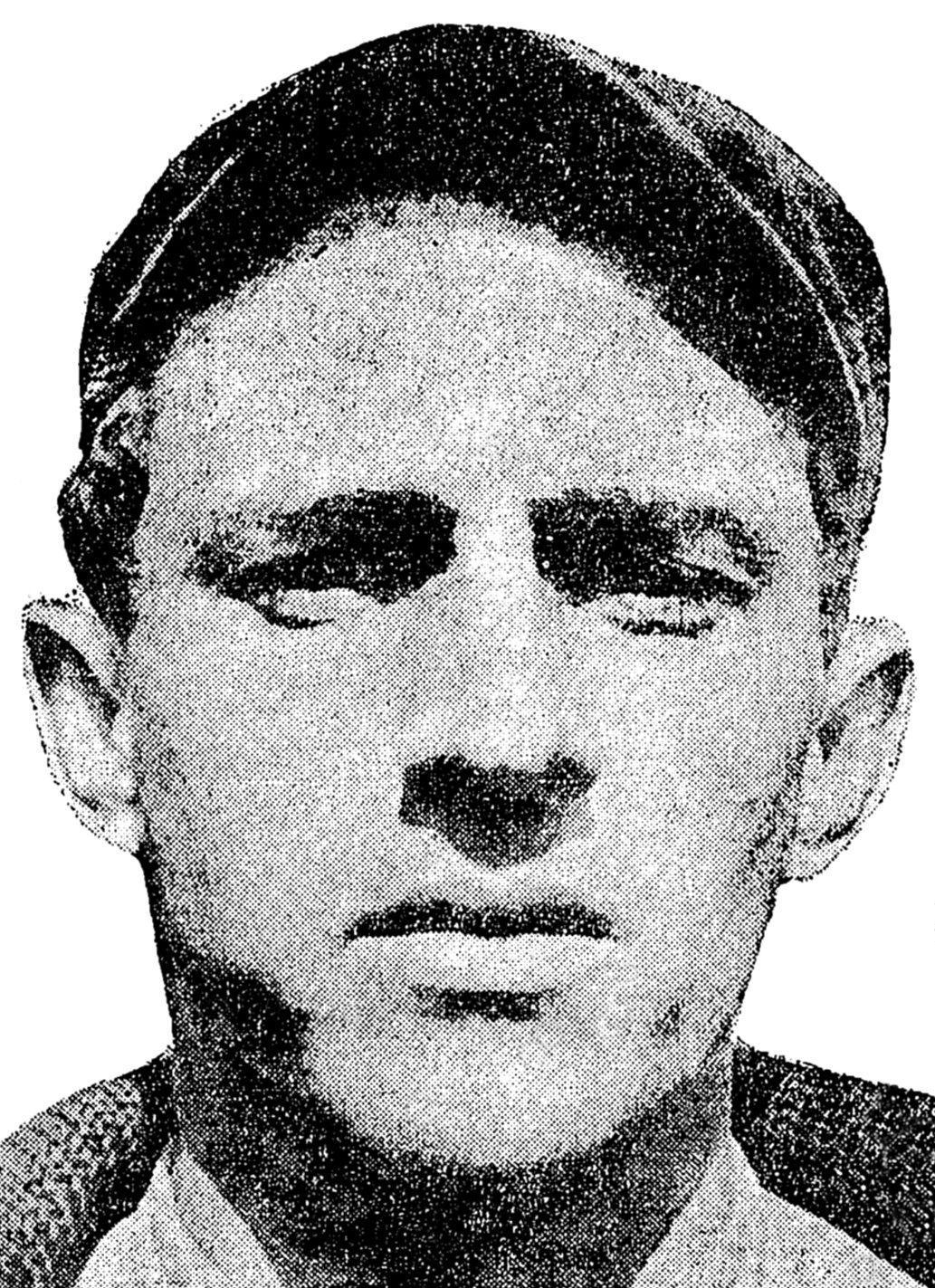
- Rogers with the 1916 Nashville Vols
- Pitcher
- Born: February 12, 1892; Sparta, Tennessee, U.S.
- Died: October 1, 1936 (aged 44); Nashville, Tennessee, U.S.
- Batted: Right Threw: Right

MLB debut
- April 14, 1917, for the St. Louis Browns

Last MLB appearance
- October 1, 1921, for the New York Yankees

MLB statistics
- Win–loss record: 15–30
- Earned run average: 3.95
- Strikeouts: 94
- Stats at Baseball Reference

Teams
- St. Louis Browns (1917–1919); Philadelphia Athletics (1919); New York Yankees (1921)

Thomas Andrew "Shotgun" Rogers (February 12, 1892 – March 7, 1936) was an American Major League Baseball pitcher from 1917 to 1921 for the St. Louis Browns, Philadelphia Athletics, and New York Yankees.

== Career ==
Rogers, who was born in Sparta, Tennessee, and grew up in Gallatin, Tennessee, began his professional career with the Nashville Vols of the Southern Association in 1914. In two seasons with the Vols, Rogers had a career win–loss record of 17–20 in 46 games, having allowed 149 runs on 305 hits. The St. Louis Browns were close to signing Rogers to a major league contract in 1915, but they felt he was not yet ready and, instead, he continued with Nashville in 1916.

On June 19, 1916, Rogers accidentally killed a longtime friend and former teammate with a pitch. The friend, Johnny Dodge of the Mobile Sea Gulls, was hit in the temple and knocked unconscious. Dodge was helped to stand and led to the showers, where he died of a brain hemorrhage.

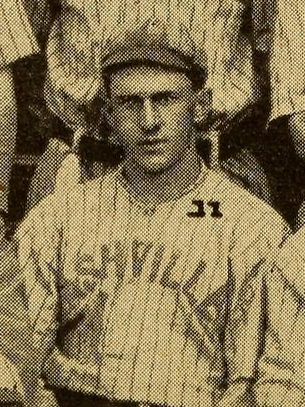
Tom Rogers pitched a perfect game at Sulphur Dell on July 11, 1916.

On July 11, 1916, on only two days of rest, Rogers pitched a perfect game against the Chattanooga Lookouts at Sulphur Dell ballpark in Nashville. The Lookouts nearly recorded a hit in the second inning when Joe Harris led off with a sharp line drive to right-center field. Center fielder Billy Lee made a diving catch at the base of the notorious Sulphur Dell right field incline, saving the perfect game bid in its early stages. A second defensive play was made by Vols left fielder Gus Williams in the top of the seventh when he crashed into the left field bleacher fence in the act of catching Jake Pitler's sharply hit ball to left. With two outs in the top of the ninth inning, John Peters came in to pinch hit for pitcher James Allen. He hit a soft fly ball to second base which was fielded by Thomas Sheehan for the final out. In all, Rogers struck out 4 of the 27 batters he faced. The game lasted just 1 hour and 25 minutes.

Thomas "Shotgun" Rogers climbed yesterday to the proudest pinnacle in the baseball world. The Gallatin Gunner, in the most gallant exhibition of slab work ever unfurled in this section of the more or less United States, reported with that fondly cherished dream of every gent who makes the diamond his habitat—a perfect game. One unmarred by either a run, a hit, or a hostile son of swat reaching the initial corner.

— The Tennessean, July 12, 1916

Rogers finished the season with a 24–12 record and having allowed only 75 runs on 243 hits. His 24 wins put him in a three-way-tie for the most wins in the Southern Association in 1916.

Having signed with the American League's St. Louis Browns for 1917, Rogers made his major league debut on April 14 against the Chicago White Sox at Sportsman's Park. Coming into the game in relief, Rogers pitched 7 innings allowing 4 runs (3 earned) while striking out 3 and walking 4 of the 25 batters he faced without figuring in the decision. He appeared in 24 games that year, including 8 starts, ending with a 3.89 earned run average (ERA) with 27 strikeouts and a 3–6 record over 108 2/3 innings.

He improved in 1918, pitching 154 innings across 29 games with 16 starts. His ERA lowered to 3.27 as he struck out 29 hitters and acquired an 8–10 record. Rogers pitched just 1 inning across 2 games for the 1919 Browns before his contract was sold in May to the Philadelphia Athletics for US$2,000. With the Athletics, he posted a 4.31 ERA with 37 strikeouts and a 4–12 record over 140 innings. He played the 1920 season with the International League's Buffalo Bisons.

Though playing most of the 1921 season with Buffalo, Rogers, pitched five games for the New York Yankees that September. In 5 games out of the bullpen, he had an ERA of 7.36 and an 0–1 record in 11 innings of work. His final appearance came on October 7 in Game 3 of the 1921 World Series, pitching the last 1 1/3 innings in a 13–5 loss to the New York Giants.

Rogers continued to play for various minor league teams in each succeeding year, before playing his final professional season with the Quincy Indians of the Illinois–Indiana–Iowa League in 1930. His career minor league record was 154–117, while his major league record was 15–30 with a 3.95 ERA.

Suffering from emotional problems as a result of Dodge's death, Rogers died from pneumonia in Nashville, Tennessee on March 7, 1936.
