= List of Nashville Vols awards, All-Stars, and league leaders =

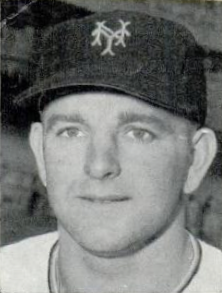
Bob Lennon led the Southern Association in five major statistical categories, set its all-time home run record, was named to the league All-Star team, and won the circuit's MVP Award in 1954.

The Nashville Vols were a Minor League Baseball team that played in Nashville, Tennessee, from 1901 to 1963. They were established as charter members of the Southern Association in 1901. Known as the Nashville Baseball Club during their first seven seasons, they became the Nashville Volunteers (regularly shortened to Vols) in 1908. Nashville remained in the Southern Association until the circuit disbanded after the 1961 season. The team sat out the 1962 campaign but returned for a final season in the South Atlantic League in 1963 before ceasing operations altogether. Over 62 seasons, numerous players, managers, and coaches won awards, were selected for All-Star teams, or led their league in various statistical areas.

Eight Vols won the Southern Association Most Valuable Player (MVP) Award, more than any other team in the league. These were: Greek George, Ed Sauer, Chuck Workman, Carl Sawatski, Bob Schultz, Jack Harshman, Bob Lennon, and Stan Palys. The only Vol to win the Rookie of the Year Award was Jim O'Toole. Eighty-seven players and four managers and coaches were selected for midseason All-Star teams. Of these, 14 were selected twice with Nashville: Buddy Gilbert, Larry Gilbert, Oris Hockett, Bob Kelly, Pete Mallory, Rube Novotney, Hugh Poland, Hal Quick, Carl Sawatski, Phil Shartzer, Jim Shilling, Dick Sisler, Leo Twardy, and Ben Wade. Two players were chosen as the MVP for their contributions in All-Star games: Tommy Brown and Chuck Coles. Additionally, the Vols served as the competition for the Southern Association All-Stars on six occasions in games held at Nashville's Sulphur Dell.

Five players hold Southern Association records for single-season performances in major statistical categories. Les Fleming holds the batting average record (.414 in 1941), Charlie Gilbert the runs record (178 in 1948), Jim Poole the runs batted in (RBI) record (167 in 1930), Joe Dwyer the doubles record (65 in 1936), and Bob Lennon the home run record (64 in 1954). Lennon led the league in five major categories in 1954: batting average (.345), hits (210), runs (139), RBI (161), and home runs (64). Charlie English led the circuit in four areas in 1942: batting average (.341), hits (217), RBI (139), and doubles (50). Ed Sauer led the league in four categories in 1943: batting average (.368), runs (113), doubles (51), and stolen bases (30).

== Key ==
Key
| † | Southern Association record |
| (#) | Number of wins by individuals who won an award multiple times |
| *^{(#)} | Tie between two or more individuals; number indicates total number of individuals with same performance |

== Awards ==
=== League awards ===
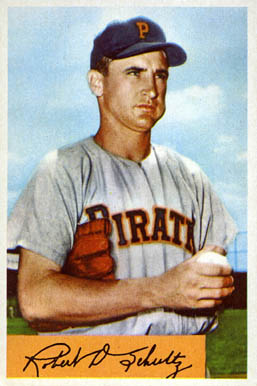
Bob Schultz, 1950 Southern Association Most Valuable Player

These players won Southern Association year-end awards during the club's membership from 1901 to 1961.

Southern Association awards
| Award | Recipient | Season | Position | Ref. |
|---|---|---|---|---|
| Most Valuable Player | Greek George (Note: Greek George and Emil Mailho of the Atlanta Crackers were named co-MVPs in 1940.) | 1940 | Catcher | |
| Most Valuable Player | Ed Sauer | 1943 | Outfielder | |
| Most Valuable Player | Chuck Workman | 1948 | Outfielder | |
| Most Valuable Player | Carl Sawatski | 1949 | Catcher | |
| Most Valuable Player | Bob Schultz | 1950 | Pitcher | |
| Most Valuable Player | Jack Harshman | 1953 | Pitcher | |
| Most Valuable Player | Bob Lennon | 1954 | Outfielder | |
| Most Valuable Player | Stan Palys | 1957 | Outfielder | |
| Rookie of the Year | Jim O'Toole | 1958 | Pitcher | |

=== All-time Vols teams ===
Nashville Banner sportswriters Fred Russell and George Leonard created two rosters of the all-time greatest players, covering the periods of 1901 to 1919 and 1920 to 1963.

==== 1901–1919 ====
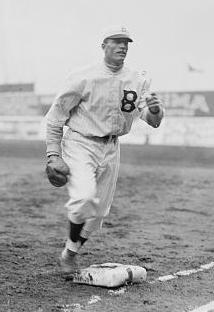
Jake Daubert was named first baseman on the 1901 to 1919 all-time Vols team by Nashville Banner sportswriter Fred Russell.

Doc Wiseman was selected as an outfielder on the 1901 to 1919 all-time Vols team

All-time Vols (1901–1919)
| Position | Player |
|---|---|
| First baseman | Jake Daubert |
| Second baseman | Ed Abbaticchio |
| Shortstop | Kid Butler |
| Third baseman | Art Kores |
| Outfielder | Tod Sloan |
| Outfielder | Gus Williams |
| Outfielder | Doc Wiseman |
| Catcher | Newt Fisher |
| Catcher | Gabby Street |
| Pitcher | Pug Cavet |
| Pitcher | Hugh Hill |
| Pitcher | Hub Perdue |
| Pitcher | Tom Rogers |
| Pitcher | War Sanders |
| Pitcher | Carl Sitton |

==== 1920–1963 ====
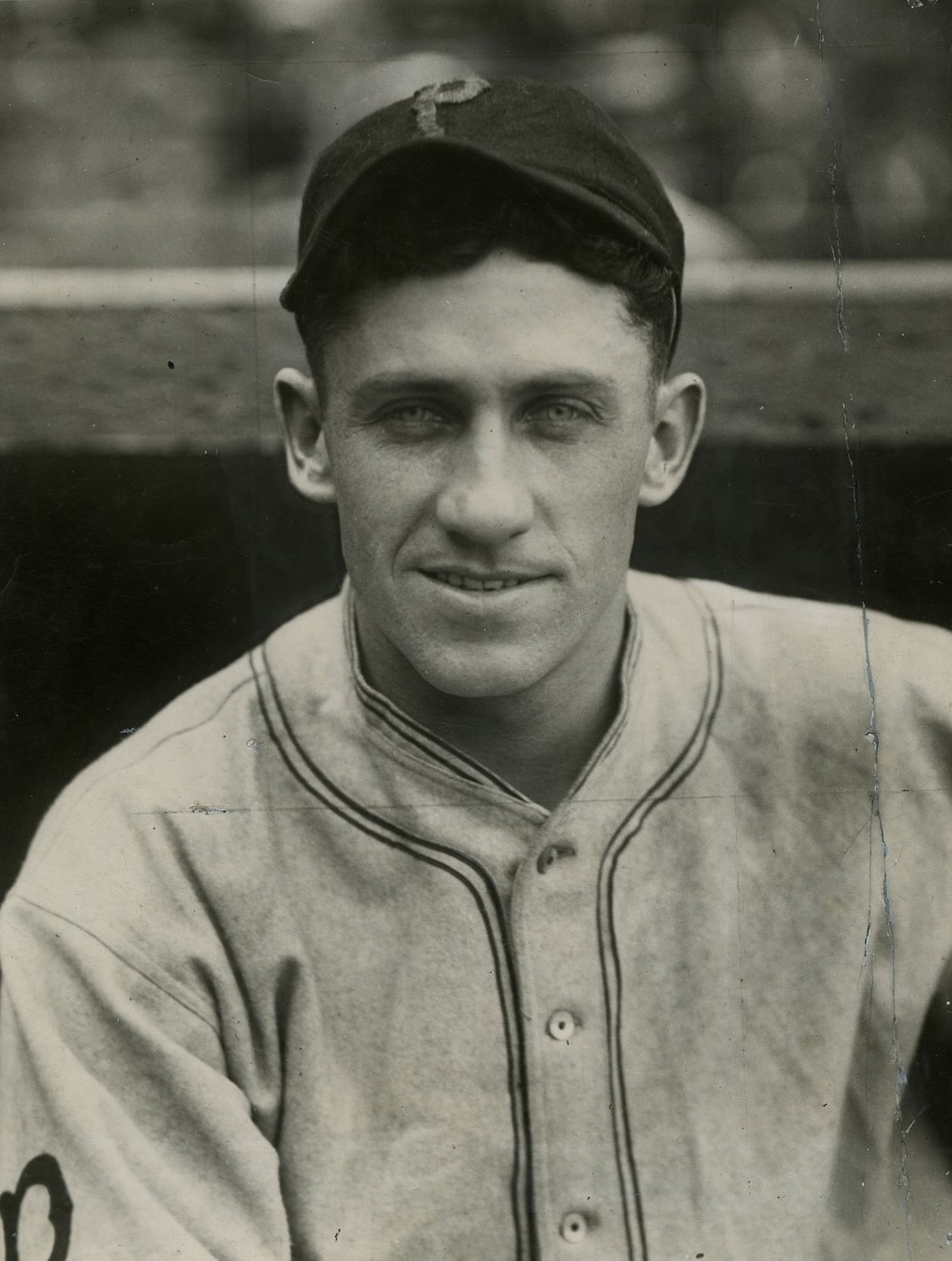
Kiki Cuyler, was chosen as an outfielder on the 1920 to 1963 all-time Vols teams by Nashville Banner sportswriters Fred Russell and George Leonard.

All-time Vols (1920–1963)
| Position | Fred Russell | George Leonard |
| Position | Player | Player |
|---|---|---|
| First baseman | Les Fleming | Les Fleming |
| Second baseman | John Mihalic | John Mihalic |
| Shortstop | Lonny Frey | Woody Williams |
| Third baseman | Charlie English | Rance Pless |
| Outfielder | Kiki Cuyler | Babe Barna |
| Outfielder | Phil Weintraub | Kiki Cuyler |
| Catcher | Greek George | Smoky Burgess |
| Catcher | Carl Sawatski | Carl Sawatski |
| Right-handed pitcher | Tiny Chaplin | Red Lucas |
| Right-handed pitcher | Red Lucas | Pete Mallory |
| Right-handed pitcher | Jim Maloney | Jim Maloney |
| Right-handed pitcher | Boots Poffenberger | Boots Poffenberger |
| Left-handed pitcher | Jim O'Toole | Jack Harshman |
| Left-handed pitcher | Bob Schultz | Jim O'Toole |
| Left-handed pitcher | Boyd Tepler | Bob Schultz |
| Manager | Larry Gilbert | Larry Gilbert |

== All-Stars ==
=== Midseason All-Stars ===
These players, coaches, and managers were selected to participate in the Southern Association All-Star Game (1938–1961) or the South Atlantic League All-Star Game (1963). Additionally, the Vols served as the competition for the Southern Association All-Stars on six occasions (1940, 1943, 1948, 1949, 1953, 1957) in games held at Nashville's Sulphur Dell.

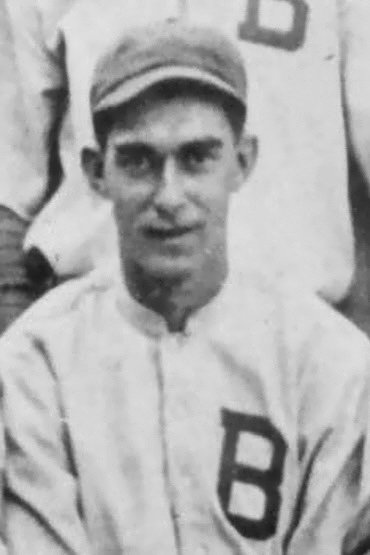
Larry Gilbert, 1941 and 1944 Southern Association All-Star manager

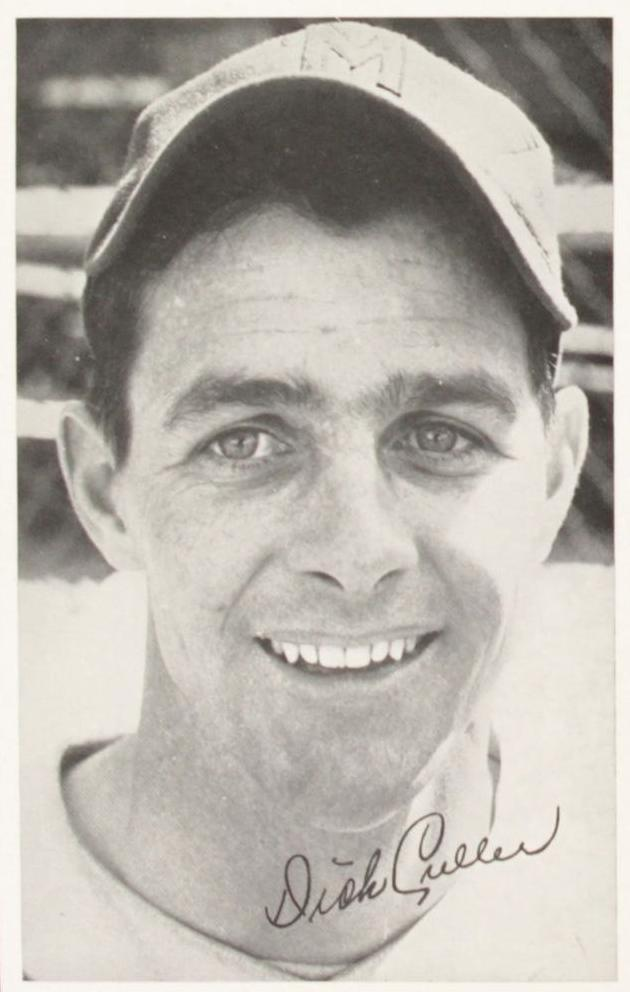
Dick Culler, 1941 Southern Association All-Star shortstop

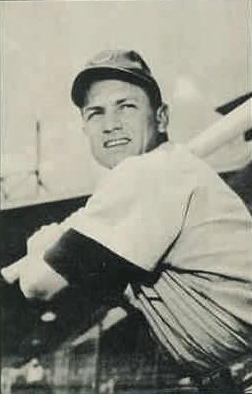
Hal Jeffcoat, 1947 Southern Association All-Star outfielder

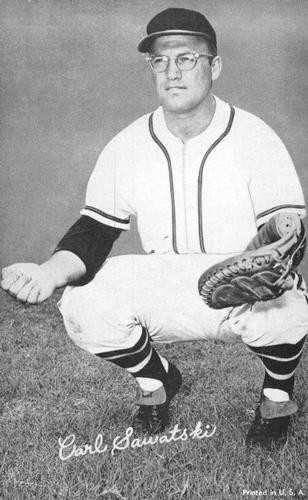
Carl Sawatski, 1949 and 1950 Southern Association All-Star catcher

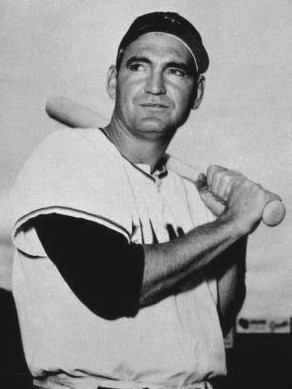
Dusty Rhodes, 1952 Southern Association All-Star outfielder

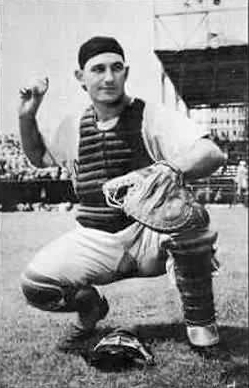
Matt Batts, 1956 Southern Association All-Star catcher

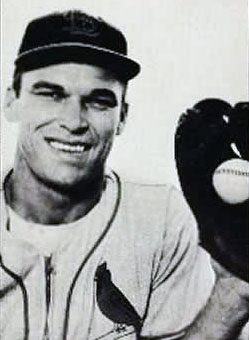
Dick Sisler, 1957 Southern Association All-Star first baseman and 1958 All-Star manager

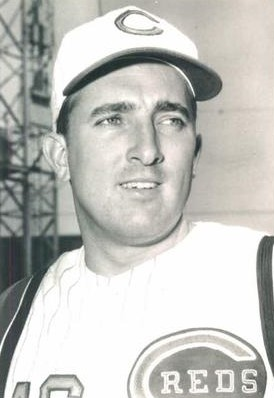
Jim Maloney, 1960 Southern Association All-Star pitcher

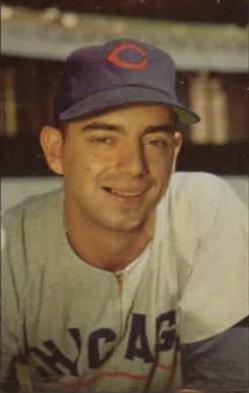
Tommy Brown, 1957 Southern Association All-Star Game MVP

Midseason All-Stars
| Season | Player | Position | Ref. |
|---|---|---|---|
| 1938 | Bill Crouch | Pitcher | |
| 1938 | Art Parks | Outfielder | |
| 1938 | Bill Rodda | Second baseman | |
| 1938 | Hub Walker | Outfielder | |
| 1939 | Rae Blaemire | Catcher | |
| 1939 | Calvin Chapman | Outfielder | |
| 1940 | Greek George | Catcher | |
| 1940 | Oris Hockett (1) | Outfielder | |
| 1940 | Boots Poffenberger | Pitcher | |
| 1941 | Dick Culler | Shortstop | |
| 1941 | Les Fleming | First baseman | |
| 1941 | Larry Gilbert (1) | Manager | |
| 1941 | Oris Hockett (2) | Outfielder | |
| 1941 | Russ Meers | Pitcher | |
| 1942 | Gus Dugas | Outfielder | |
| 1942 | Charlie English | Third baseman | |
| 1942 | Jim Shilling (1) | First baseman | |
| 1942 | Vito Tamulis | Pitcher | |
| 1943 | Glenn Gardner | Pitcher | |
| 1943 | Ray Hamrick | Shortstop | |
| 1943 | Ed Sauer | Outfielder | |
| 1944 | Charlie Brewster | Shortstop | |
| 1944 | Charlie Cuellar | Pitcher | |
| 1944 | Larry Gilbert (2) | Manager | |
| 1946 | Heinz Becker | First baseman | |
| 1946 | Paul Gillespie | Catcher | |
| 1946 | Ted Pawelek | Catcher | |
| 1946 | Jim Shilling (2) | Second baseman | |
| 1946 | Leo Twardy (1) | Pitcher | |
| 1947 | Roy Easterwood | Catcher | |
| 1947 | Hal Jeffcoat | Outfielder | |
| 1947 | Pete Mallory (1) | Pitcher | |
| 1947 | Hal Quick (1) | Shortstop | |
| 1947 | Hank Schenz | Utility | |
| 1947 | Ben Wade (1) | Pitcher | |
| 1947 | Rube Walker | Catcher | |
| 1948 | Charlie Gilbert | Outfielder | |
| 1948 | Hal Quick (2) | Shortstop | |
| 1948 | Leo Twardy (2) | Pitcher | |
| 1948 | Ben Wade (2) | Pitcher | |
| 1948 | Chuck Workman | Outfielder | |
| 1949 | Babe Barna | Outfielder | |
| 1949 | Tookie Gilbert | First baseman | |
| 1949 | Pete Mallory (2) | Pitcher | |
| 1949 | Frank Marino | Pitcher | |
| 1949 | Carl Sawatski (1) | Catcher | |
| 1950 | Tommy Neill | Outfielder | |
| 1950 | Carl Sawatski (2) | Catcher | |
| 1950 | Bob Schultz | Pitcher | |
| 1951 | Jim Atchley | Pitcher | |
| 1951 | Bob Brady | Catcher | |
| 1951 | Robert Ludwig | Third baseman | |
| 1951 | Don Osborn | Manager | |
| 1951 | Ralph Rowe | Outfielder | |
| 1951 | Daryl Spencer | Shortstop | |
| 1952 | Pete Modica | Pitcher | |
| 1952 | Rube Novotney (1) | Catcher | |
| 1952 | Rance Pless | Third baseman | |
| 1952 | Hugh Poland (1) | Coach | |
| 1952 | Charlie Ray | Pitcher | |
| 1952 | Dusty Rhodes | Outfielder | |
| 1953 | Bob Boring | Third baseman | |
| 1953 | Jack Harshman | Pitcher | |
| 1953 | Rube Novotney (2) | Catcher | |
| 1954 | Bob Lennon | Outfielder | |
| 1954 | Hugh Poland (2) | Manager | |
| 1954 | Eric Rodin | Outfielder | |
| 1955 | Neil Chrisley | Outfielder | |
| 1955 | Benjamin Downs | Outfielder | |
| 1955 | Don Gross | Pitcher | |
| 1955 | Bob Hazle | Outfielder | |
| 1955 | Jerry Lane | Pitcher | |
| 1955 | Charles Williams | Second baseman | |
| 1956 | Matt Batts | Catcher | |
| 1956 | John Brechin | Pitcher | |
| 1956 | Ralph Brown | Outfielder | |
| 1956 | Tommy Brown | Third baseman | |
| 1956 | Bob Kelly (1) | Pitcher | |
| 1956 | Larry Taylor | Utility | |
| 1957 | Jerry Davis | Pitcher | |
| 1957 | Dutch Dotterer | Catcher | |
| 1957 | Bob Kelly (2) | Pitcher | |
| 1957 | Don Nicholas | Outfielder | |
| 1957 | Stan Palys | Outfielder | |
| 1957 | Phil Shartzer (1) | Shortstop | |
| 1957 | Dick Sisler (1) | First baseman (Note: Dick Sisler was also manager of the 1957 Vols.) | |
| 1958 | George Archie | Coach | |
| 1958 | Chuck Coles | First baseman | |
| 1958 | Jim Fridley | Outfielder | |
| 1958 | Buddy Gilbert (1) | Outfielder | |
| 1958 | Jim O'Toole | Pitcher | |
| 1958 | Dick Sisler (2) | Manager | |
| 1959 | Ultus Álvarez | Outfielder | |
| 1959 | Larry Davidson | Outfielder | |
| 1959 | Tom Gibson | Pitcher | |
| 1959 | Edward Irons | Catcher | |
| 1959 | Phil Shartzer (2) | Shortstop | |
| 1960 | Cliff Cook | Third baseman | |
| 1960 | Jim Maloney | Pitcher | |
| 1960 | Johnny Edwards | Catcher | |
| 1961 | Buddy Gilbert (2) | Outfielder | |
| 1961 | Ev Joyner | Outfielder | |
| 1961 | Wally Seward | Pitcher | |
| 1963 | Aubrey Gatewood | Pitcher | |
| 1963 | Marv Staehle | Shortstop | |

=== All-Star Game MVPs ===
These players won Most Valuable Player (MVP) Awards for their contributions in the Southern Association All-Star Game (1938–1961).

All-Star Game MVPs
| Season | Player | Position | Ref. |
|---|---|---|---|
| 1957 | Tommy Brown (Note: The Vols served as the competition for the 1957 Southern Association All-Stars. Though not selected as an All-Star, Nashville's Tommy Brown was chosen as the game's MVP.) | Third baseman | |
| 1958 | Chuck Coles | First baseman | |

== League leaders ==
=== Batting leaders ===
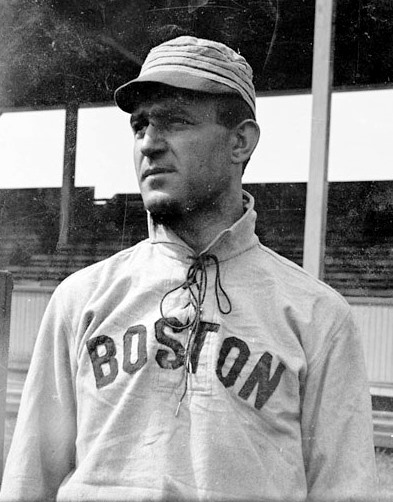
Ed Abbaticchio led the Southern Association in runs (127) in 1901 and in triples (18) and stolen bases (61) in 1902.

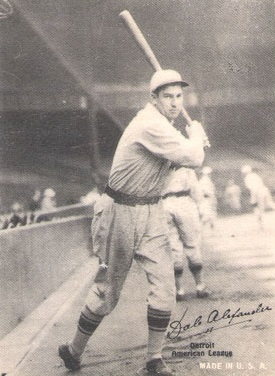
Dale Alexander led the Southern Association with 42 doubles in 1937.

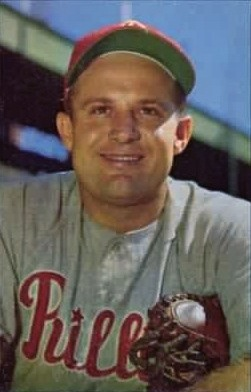
Smoky Burgess led the Southern Association with a .384 batting average in 1948.

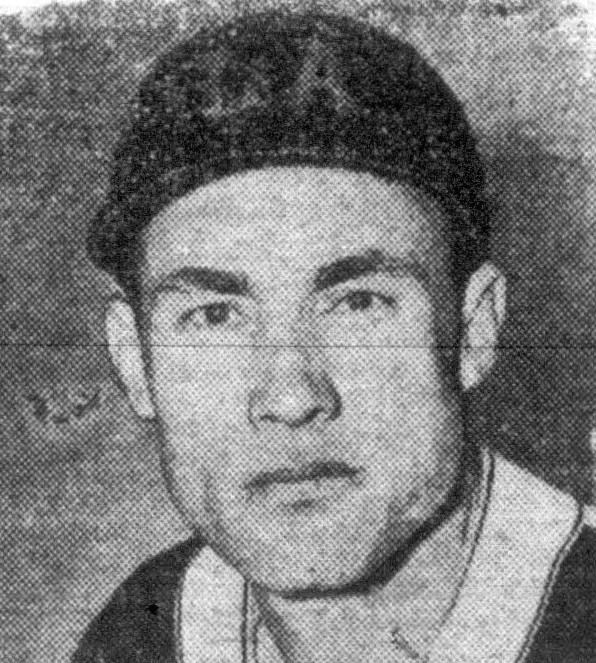
Charlie English led the Southern Association in batting average (.341), hits (217), runs batted in (139), and doubles (50) in 1942.

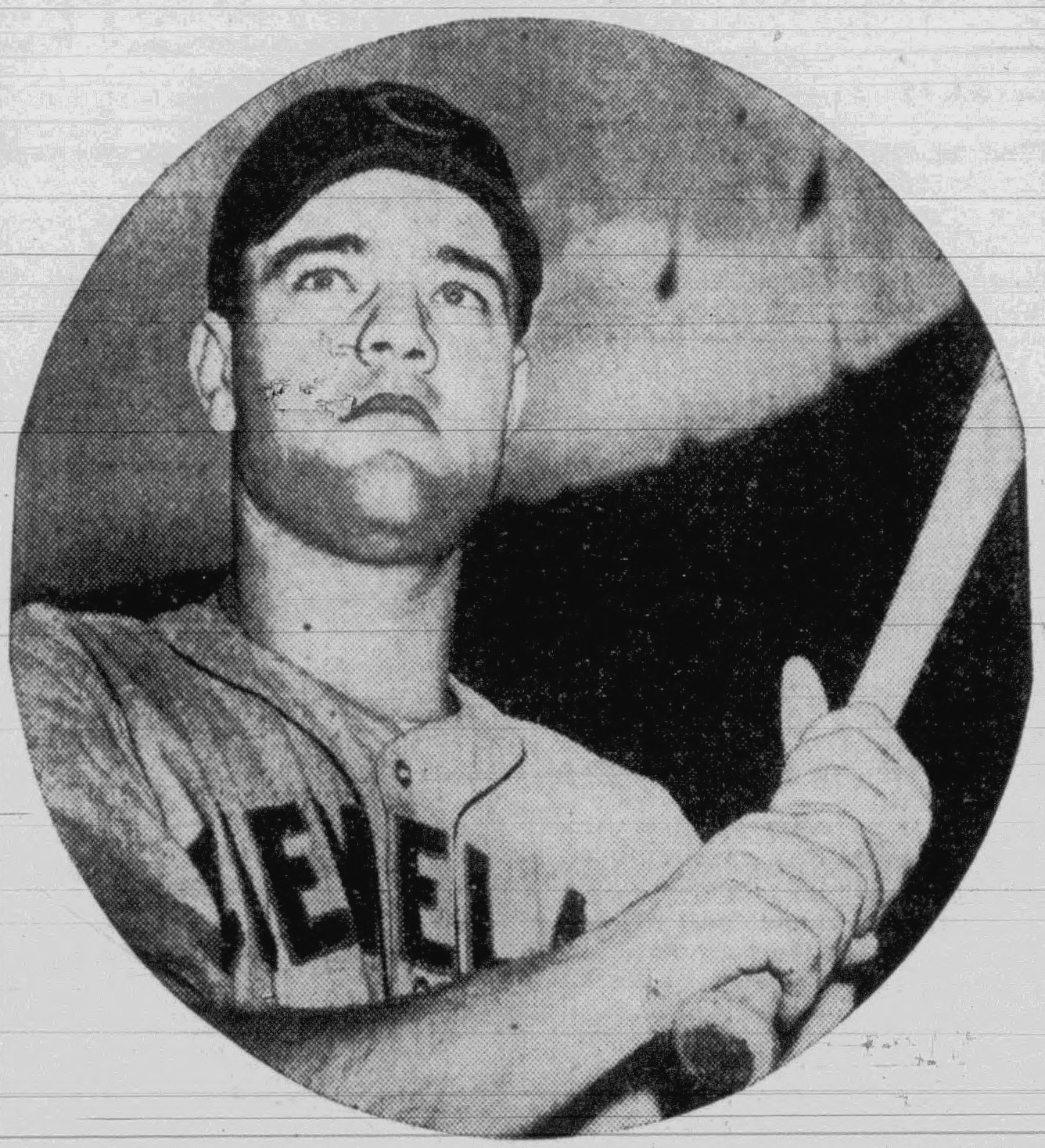
Les Fleming set the all-time Southern Association batting average record of .414 in 1941.

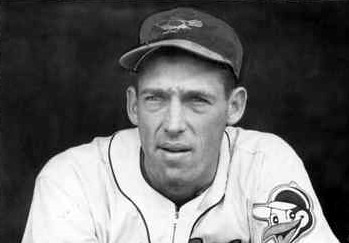
Jack Harshman led the Southern Association with 47 home runs in 1951.

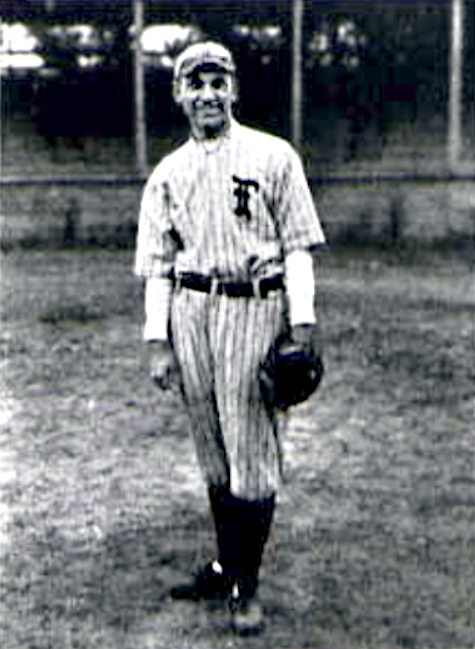
Lance Richbourg led the Southern Association in doubles (46) and stolen bases (30) in 1933.

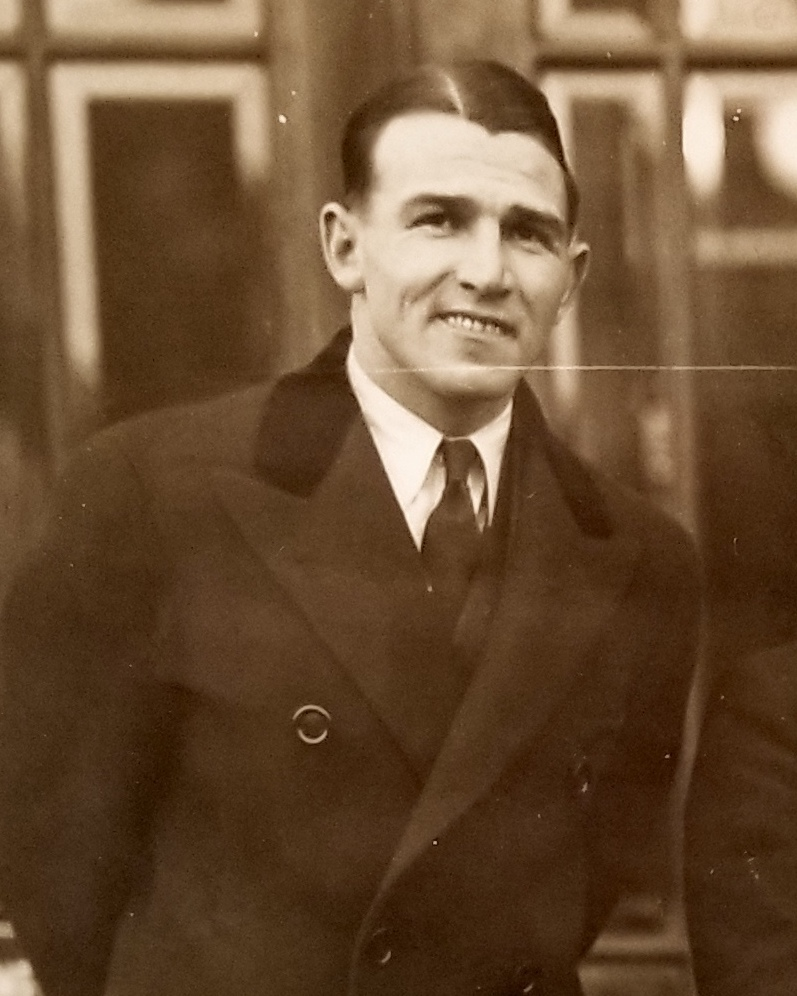
Doug Taitt led the Southern Association in batting average (.355), hits (194), and home runs (17) in 1935 and in runs batted in (132) and home runs (20) in 1936.

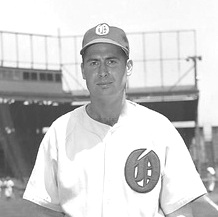
Chuck Workman led the Southern Association in home runs (29) in 1942 and in home runs (52) and runs batted in (182) in 1948.

These players led all other players in their league in distinct statistical batting categories in a single season.

Individual batting leaders
| Statistic | Player | Record | Season | Ref. |
|---|---|---|---|---|
| Batting average | Harry Welchonce | .325 | 1912 | |
| Batting average | Moose Clabaugh | .378 | 1931 | |
| Batting average | Moose Clabaugh | .382 | 1932 | |
| Batting average | Phil Weintraub | .401 | 1934 | |
| Batting average | Doug Taitt | .355 | 1935 | |
| Batting average | Bert Haas | .365 | 1939 | |
| Batting average | Les Fleming | .414^{†} | 1941 | |
| Batting average | Charlie English | .341 | 1942 | |
| Batting average | Ed Sauer | .368 | 1943 | |
| Batting average | Smoky Burgess | .384 | 1948 | |
| Batting average | Bob Borkowski | .376 | 1949 | |
| Batting average | Babe Barna | .358 | 1951 | |
| Batting average | Rance Pless | .364 | 1952 | |
| Batting average | Bill Taylor | .350 | 1953 | |
| Batting average | Bob Lennon | .345 | 1954 | |
| Batting average | Charles Williams | .368 | 1955 | |
| Batting average | Stan Palys | .359 | 1957 | |
| Batting average | Jim Fridley | .348 | 1958 | |
| Batting average | Marv Staehle | .337 | 1963 | |
| Hits | Pug Bennett | 166 | 1904 | |
| Hits | Frank Norcum | 157 | 1905 | |
| Hits | Harry Welchonce | 157 | 1912 | |
| Hits | Bill Rodda | 190*^{(2)} | 1934 | |
| Hits | Doug Taitt | 194 | 1935 | |
| Hits | Joe Dwyer | 194 | 1936 | |
| Hits | Arnie Moser | 223 | 1940 | |
| Hits | Charlie English | 217 | 1942 | |
| Hits | Hal Jeffcoat | 218 | 1947 | |
| Hits | Tookie Gilbert | 197 | 1949 | |
| Hits | Robert Ludwig | 213 | 1951 | |
| Hits | Rance Pless | 196 | 1952 | |
| Hits | Bob Lennon | 210 | 1954 | |
| Hits | Charles Williams | 211 | 1955 | |
| Runs | Ed Abbaticchio | 127 | 1901 | |
| Runs | Doc Wiseman | 111 | 1902 | |
| Runs | Frank Norcum | 86 | 1905 | |
| Runs | Jay Partridge | 155 | 1930 | |
| Runs | Bill Rodda | 140 | 1932 | |
| Runs | Joe Dwyer | 127 | 1936 | |
| Runs | John Mihalic | 124 | 1942 | |
| Runs | Ed Sauer | 113 | 1943 | |
| Runs | Charlie Gilbert | 178^{†} | 1948 | |
| Runs | Tookie Gilbert | 146 | 1949 | |
| Runs | Bob Boring | 108 | 1953 | |
| Runs | Bob Lennon | 139 | 1954 | |
| Runs | Bob Hazle | 114 | 1955 | |
| Runs | Stan Palys | 116 | 1957 | |
| Runs batted in | Albert Bernsen | 118 | 1923 | |
| Runs batted in | Chick Tolson | 143 | 1925 | |
| Runs batted in | Jim Poole | 127 | 1929 | |
| Runs batted in | Jim Poole | 167^{†} | 1930 | |
| Runs batted in | Stan Keyes | 147 | 1932 | |
| Runs batted in | Doug Taitt | 132 | 1936 | |
| Runs batted in | Gus Dugas | 118*^{(2)} | 1940 | |
| Runs batted in | Charlie English | 139 | 1942 | |
| Runs batted in | Mel Hicks | 107 | 1943 | |
| Runs batted in | Chuck Workman | 182 | 1948 | |
| Runs batted in | Carl Sawatski | 153 | 1949 | |
| Runs batted in | Bob Lennon | 161 | 1954 | |
| Runs batted in | Chuck Coles | 107 | 1958 | |
| Doubles | Gus Williams | 33 | 1916 | |
| Doubles | Pete Knisely | 42 | 1917 | |
| Doubles | Fred Graf | 31*^{(2)} | 1919 | |
| Doubles | Chick Tolson | 44 | 1925 | |
| Doubles | Lance Richbourg | 46 | 1933 | |
| Doubles | Bill Rodda | 46 | 1934 | |
| Doubles | Joe Martin | 45*^{(2)} | 1935 | |
| Doubles | Joe Dwyer | 65^{†} | 1936 | |
| Doubles | Dale Alexander | 42 | 1937 | |
| Doubles | Charlie English | 50 | 1942 | |
| Doubles | Ed Sauer | 51 | 1943 | |
| Doubles | William Manning | 41 | 1946 | |
| Doubles | Cy Block | 50 | 1947 | |
| Doubles | Bob Boring | 42*^{(2)} | 1953 | |
| Doubles | Billy Gardner | 42*^{(2)} | 1953 | |
| Doubles | Charles Williams | 44 | 1955 | |
| Doubles | Mel Corbo | 31 | 1963 | |
| Triples | Ed Abbaticchio | 18 | 1902 | |
| Triples | Kitty Wickham | 14 | 1919 | |
| Triples | Bevo LeBourveau | 20 | 1923 | |
| Triples | Ultus Álvarez | 12 | 1959 | |
| Home runs | Tex McDonald | 8 | 1919 | |
| Home runs | Rip Wade | 24 | 1928 | |
| Home runs | Jim Poole | 33 | 1929 | |
| Home runs | Jim Poole | 50 | 1930 | |
| Home runs | Moose Clabaugh | 23 | 1931 | |
| Home runs | Stan Keyes | 35 | 1932 | |
| Home runs | Dutch Prather | 23 | 1933 | |
| Home runs | Doug Taitt | 17 | 1935 | |
| Home runs | Doug Taitt | 20*^{(2)} | 1936 | |
| Home runs | Willie Duke | 19 | 1937 | |
| Home runs | Gus Dugas | 22*^{(2)} | 1940 | |
| Home runs | Chuck Workman | 29 | 1942 | |
| Home runs | Mel Hicks | 16 | 1944 | |
| Home runs | Ted Pawelek | 15 | 1946 | |
| Home runs | Chuck Workman | 52 | 1948 | |
| Home runs | Carl Sawatski | 45 | 1949 | |
| Home runs | Jack Harshman | 47 | 1951 | |
| Home runs | Bob Lennon | 64^{†} | 1954 | |
| Home runs | Bob Hazle | 29 | 1955 | |
| Stolen bases | Ed Abbaticchio | 61 | 1902 | |
| Stolen bases | Dave Callahan | 54 | 1914 | |
| Stolen bases | Kiki Cuyler | 68 | 1923 | |
| Stolen bases | Lance Richbourg | 30 | 1933 | |
| Stolen bases | Charlie Brewster | 20 | 1942 | |
| Stolen bases | Ed Sauer | 30 | 1943 | |
| Stolen bases | Don Nicholas | 16 | 1957 | |

=== Pitching leaders ===
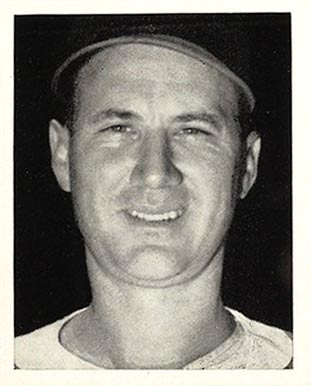
Bill Crouch co-led the Southern Association with 21 wins in 1938.

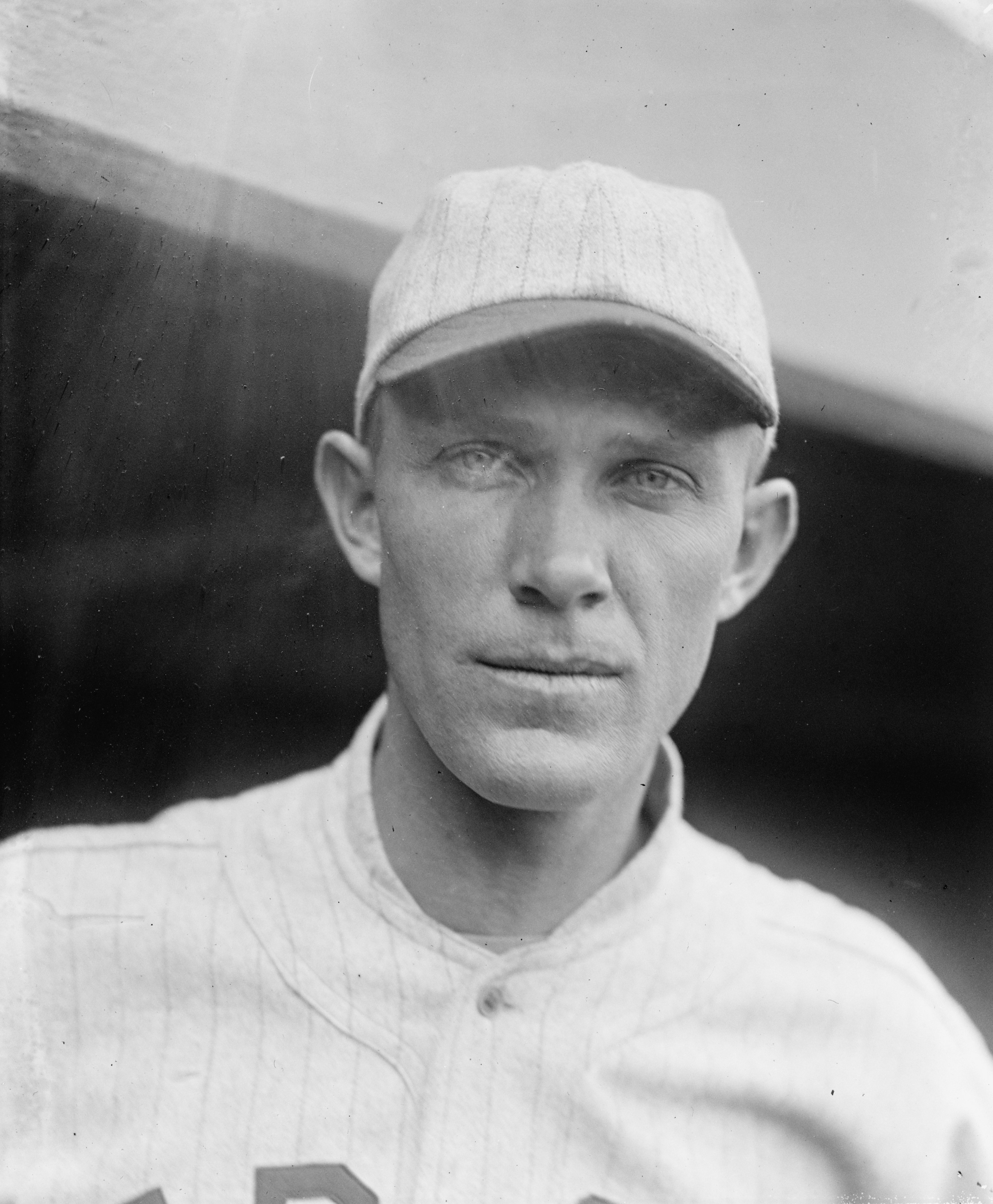
Oscar Fuhr co-led the Southern Association with 103 strikeouts in 1927.

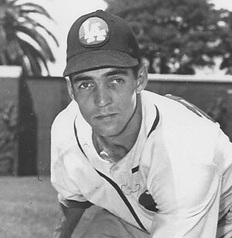
Dutch McCall led the Southern Association in with 179 strikeouts in 1946.

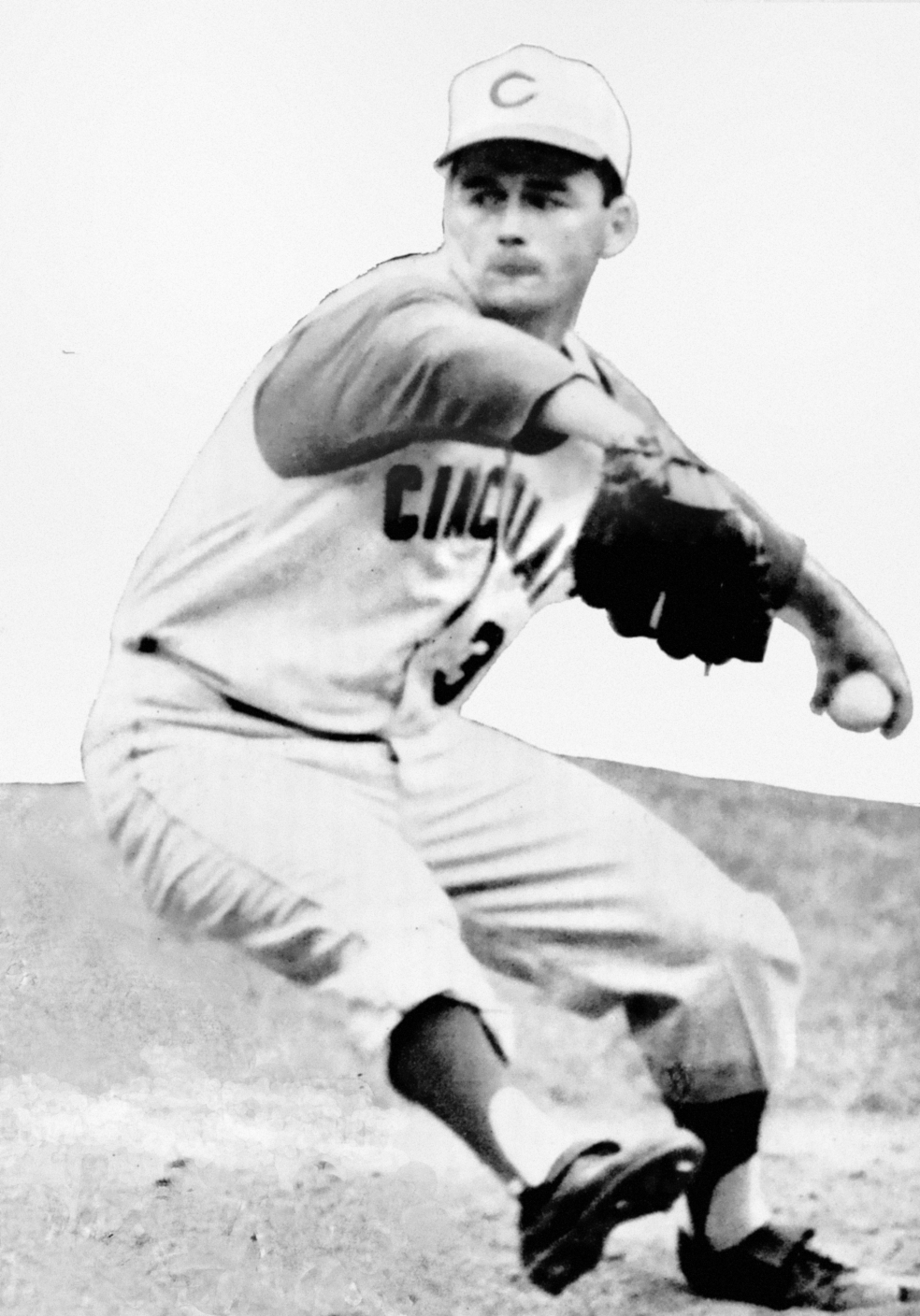
Jim O'Toole led the Southern Association in innings pitched (280) and co-led in wins (20) in 1958.

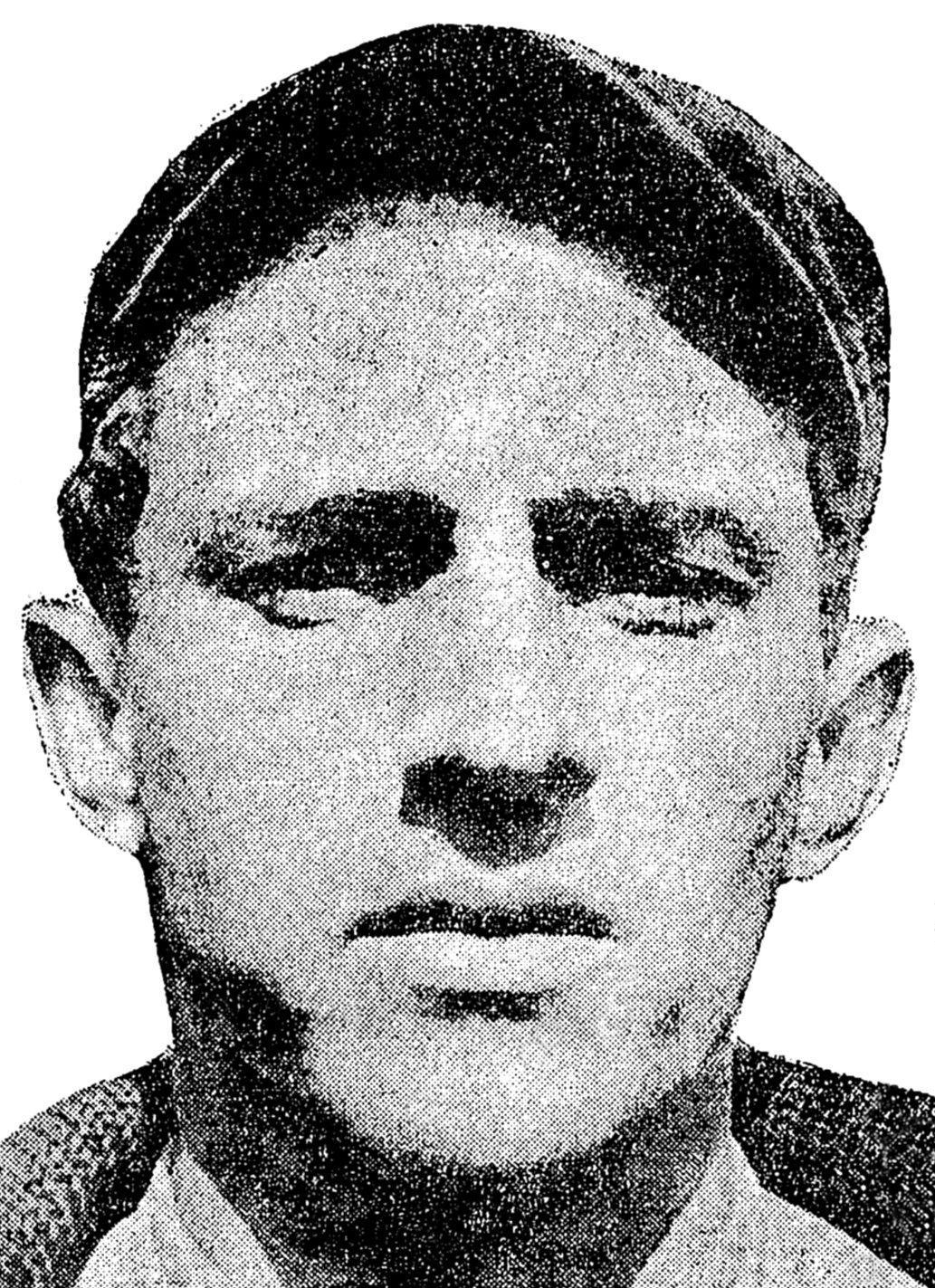
Tom Rogers co-led the league with 24 wins in 1916.

These pitchers led all other pitchers in their league in distinct statistical pitching categories in a single season.

Individual pitching leaders
| Statistic | Player | Record | Season | Ref. |
|---|---|---|---|---|
| Wins | Guy Sample | 25 | 1901 | |
| Wins | Hub Perdue | 23 | 1909 | |
| Wins | Tom Rogers | 24*^{(3)} | 1916 | |
| Wins | Benny Frey | 22*^{(3)} | 1929 | |
| Wins | Tiny Chaplin | 24*^{(2)} | 1935 | |
| Wins | By Speece | 22 | 1936 | |
| Wins | Bill Crouch | 21*^{(3)} | 1938 | |
| Wins | Boots Poffenberger | 26 | 1940 | |
| Wins | Pete Mallory | 20 | 1949 | |
| Wins | Bob Schultz | 25 | 1950 | |
| Wins | Jack Harshman | 23 | 1953 | |
| Wins | Bob Kelly | 24 | 1957 | |
| Wins | Jim O'Toole | 20*^{(3)} | 1958 | |
| Losses | Walter Deaver | 24 | 1902 | |
| Losses | Wiley Piatt | 22 | 1904 | |
| Losses | Art Herman | 21 | 1905 | |
| Losses | Frank Bair | 21 | 1912 | |
| Losses | Art Decatur | 11*^{(2)} | 1918 | |
| Losses | Emory Zumbro | 19 | 1930 | |
| Losses | George Milstead | 24 | 1931 | |
| Losses | Sharkey Eiland | 16*^{(5)} | 1935 | |
| Losses | Ray Starr | 20 | 1938 | |
| Losses | William Padget | 18 | 1954 | |
| Losses | Bob Kelly | 16 | 1956 | |
| Innings pitched | Heinie Berger | 310 | 1914 | |
| Innings pitched | Lefty Willis | 257*^{(2)} | 1930 | |
| Innings pitched | Alex McColl | 257*^{(2)} | 1930 | |
| Innings pitched | Tiny Chaplin | 304 | 1933 | |
| Innings pitched | Ray Starr | 276 | 1937 | |
| Innings pitched | Bob Kelly | 259 | 1957 | |
| Innings pitched | Jim O'Toole | 280 | 1958 | |
| Strikeouts | Claude Jonnard | 134 | 1919 | |
| Strikeouts | Cy Warmoth | 170 | 1922 | |
| Strikeouts | George Pipgras | 141 | 1925 | |
| Strikeouts | Oscar Fuhr | 103*^{(2)} | 1927 | |
| Strikeouts | Jackie Reid | 135 | 1933 | |
| Strikeouts | Ace Adams | 122 | 1940 | |
| Strikeouts | Russ Meers | 161 | 1941 | |
| Strikeouts | George Jeffcoat | 146 | 1942 | |
| Strikeouts | Boyd Tepler | 147 | 1944 | |
| Strikeouts | Dutch McCall | 179 | 1946 | |
| Strikeouts | Ben Wade | 145 | 1947 | |
| Strikeouts | Al Worthington | 152 | 1952 | |
| Strikeouts | Jim Constable | 183 | 1953 | |
| Strikeouts | Joe Margoneri | 184 | 1954 | |
| Walks | Cy Warmoth | 151 | 1921 | |
| Walks | Sharkey Eiland | 96 | 1935 | |
| Walks | Ray Starr | 121 | 1938 | |
| Walks | Russ Meers | 167 | 1941 | |
| Walks | Dutch McCall | 128 | 1946 | |
| Walks | Al Worthington | 140 | 1952 | |
| Walks | Jack Harshman | 116 | 1953 | |
| Walks | Joe Margoneri | 124 | 1954 | |
| Walks | Jerry Davis | 146 | 1957 | |
| Walks | Jim O'Toole | 132 | 1958 | |
