= Southern Association Most Valuable Player Award =

- Sport: Baseball
- League: Southern Association
- Awarded for: Regular-season most valuable player of the Southern Association
- Country: United States
- Presented by: Southern Association

History
- First award: Red Nonnenkamp (1936)
- Final award: Howie Koplitz (1961)
- Most wins: Ted Cieslak (2); Stan Palys (2)

The Southern Association Most Valuable Player Award (MVP) was an annual award given to the best player in Minor League Baseball's Southern Association based on their regular-season performance as voted on by league sportswriters. Early iterations of the honor were voted on by league managers. Though the league was established in 1901, the award was not created until 1936. It continued to be issued through the 1961 season, after which the league disbanded.

Two players won the award twice: Ted Cieslak, who won back-to-back in 1945 and 1946, and Stan Palys, the winner in 1957 and 1960.

Eleven outfielders won the MVP Award, the most of any position. Catchers and first basemen, each with three winners, won the most among infielders, followed by second baseman and third baseman (2). Six pitchers also won the award.

Eight players from the Nashville Vols were selected for the MVP Award, more than any other team in the league, followed by the Atlanta Crackers (4); the Birmingham Barons, Little Rock Travelers, Memphis Chicks, and Mobile Bears (3); and the Chattanooga Lookouts, Knoxville Smokies, and New Orleans Pelicans (1).

Four players from the Chicago Cubs Major League Baseball (MLB) organization won the MVP Award, more than any other, followed by the Cleveland Indians and Detroit Tigers organizations (3); the Brooklyn Dodgers, New York Giants, and Pittsburgh Pirates organizations (2); the Boston Red Sox, Chicago White Sox, Cincinnati Reds, St. Louis Browns, and Washington Senators organizations (1). Five players were from teams unaffiliated with any MLB organization.

== Winners ==
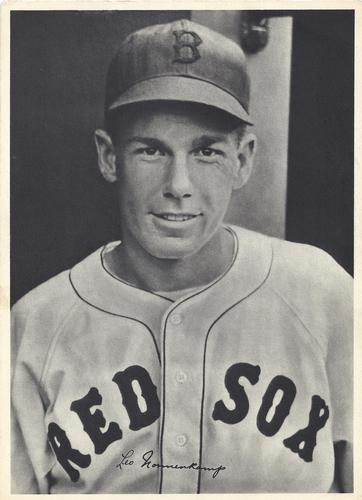
Red Nonnenkamp won the first MVP Award in 1936 with the Little Rock Travelers.

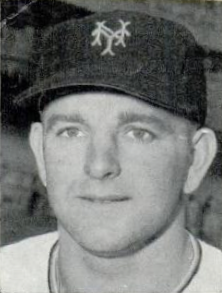
Bob Lennon, the 1954 MVP, was one of nine Nashville Vols to win the award.

Key
Position	Indicates the player's primary position
(#)	Number of wins by players who have won the award multiple times
^	Indicates multiple award winners in the same year

Winners
Year	Winner	Team	Organization	Position	Ref.
1936	Red Nonnenkamp	Little Rock Travelers	Boston Red Sox	Outfielder	
1937	Coaker Triplett	Memphis Chicks	Unaffiliated	Outfielder	
1938	Red Evans	New Orleans Pelicans	Cleveland Indians	Pitcher	
1939	Babe Young	Knoxville Smokies	Pittsburgh Pirates	First baseman	
1940^	Greek George	Nashville Vols	Brooklyn Dodgers	Catcher	
1940^	Emil Mailho	Atlanta Crackers	Unaffiliated	Outfielder	
1941	Les Burge	Atlanta Crackers	Pittsburgh Pirates	First baseman	
1942	Roy Schalk	Little Rock Travelers	Unaffiliated	Second baseman	
1943	Ed Sauer	Nashville Vols	Chicago Cubs	Outfielder	
1944	Pete Gray	Memphis Chicks	St. Louis Browns	Outfielder	
1945	Ted Cieslak (1)	Atlanta Crackers	Unaffiliated	Third baseman	
1946	Ted Cieslak (2)	Atlanta Crackers	Unaffiliated	Third baseman	
1947	Cliff Dapper	Mobile Bears	Brooklyn Dodgers	Catcher	
1948	Chuck Workman	Nashville Vols	Chicago Cubs	Outfielder	
1949	Carl Sawatski	Nashville Vols	Chicago Cubs	Catcher	
1950	Bob Schultz	Nashville Vols	Chicago Cubs	Pitcher	
1951	Halbert Simpson	Little Rock Travelers	Detroit Tigers	Outfielder	
1952	Ellis Clary	Chattanooga Lookouts	Washington Senators	Second baseman	
1953	Jack Harshman	Nashville Vols	New York Giants	Pitcher	
1954	Bob Lennon	Nashville Vols	New York Giants	Outfielder	
1955	Ed White	Memphis Chicks	Chicago White Sox	Outfielder	
1956	Gene Lary	Mobile Bears	Cleveland Indians	Pitcher	
1957	Stan Palys (1)	Nashville Vols	Cincinnati Reds	Outfielder	
1958	Bill Harrington	Birmingham Barons	Detroit Tigers	Pitcher	
1959	Gordy Coleman	Mobile Bears	Cleveland Indians	First baseman	
1960	Stan Palys (2)	Birmingham Barons	Detroit Tigers	Outfielder	
1961	Howie Koplitz	Birmingham Barons	Detroit Tigers	Pitcher	

== Wins by team ==
Team	Award(s)	Year(s)
Nashville Vols	8	1940, 1943, 1948, 1949, 1950, 1953, 1954, 1957
Atlanta Crackers	4	1940, 1941, 1945, 1946
Birmingham Barons	3	1958, 1960, 1961
Little Rock Travelers	3	1936, 1942, 1951
Memphis Chicks	3	1937, 1944, 1955
Mobile Bears	3	1947, 1956, 1959
Chattanooga Lookouts	1	1952
Knoxville Smokies	1	1939
New Orleans Pelicans	1	1939

== Wins by organization ==
Organization	Award(s)	Year(s)
Chicago Cubs	4	1943, 1948, 1949, 1950
Detroit Tigers	4	1951, 1958, 1960, 1961
Cleveland Indians	3	1938, 1956, 1959
Brooklyn Dodgers	2	1940, 1947
New York Giants	2	1953, 1954
Pittsburgh Pirates	2	1939, 1941
Boston Red Sox	1	1936
Chicago White Sox	1	1955
Cincinnati Reds	1	1957
St. Louis Browns	1	1944
Washington Senators	1	1952
