= Larry Gilbert (baseball) =

American baseball player (1891-1965)

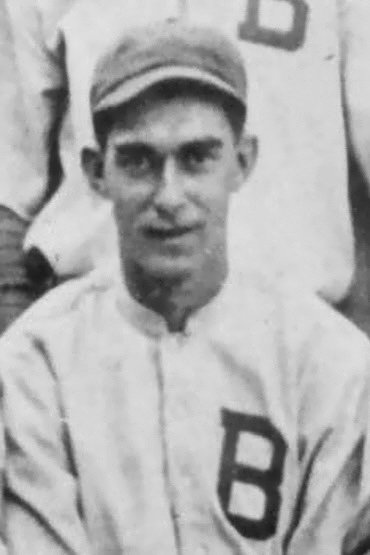
- Right fielder
- Born: December 3, 1891; New Orleans, Louisiana, U.S.
- Died: February 17, 1965 (aged 73); New Orleans, Louisiana, U.S.
- Batted: Left Threw: Left

MLB debut
- April 14, 1914, for the Boston Braves

Last MLB appearance
- July 12, 1915, for the Boston Braves

MLB statistics
- Batting average: .230
- Home runs: 5
- Runs batted in: 29
- Stats at Baseball Reference

Teams
- Boston Braves (1914–1915)

Career highlights and awards
- World Series champion (1914)

Lawrence William Gilbert (December 3, 1891 – February 17, 1965) was an American right fielder in Major League Baseball and a longtime manager in minor league baseball. A native of New Orleans, Louisiana, who broke into baseball as pitcher, Gilbert first became famous as a member of the 1914 "Miracle" Boston Braves.

== Playing career ==
The 5 ft 9 in (1.75 m), 158 lb (72 kg) Gilbert batted and threw left-handed. Gilbert's professional playing career extended for 16 years (1910 to 1925). But his Major League career lasted only two seasons—the Braves' breakthrough 1914 campaign and 1915. In 117 big-league games, he batted .230 with 76 hits, five homers, 29 runs batted in, ten doubles and seven stolen bases.

In 1914, Gilbert was a member of the Braves team that went from the eight-team National League's basement to first place in two months, becoming the first team to win a pennant after being in last place on the Fourth of July. The team then went on to defeat Connie Mack's heavily favored Philadelphia Athletics in the 1914 World Series. In his lone appearance in the series, Gilbert drew an intentional walk off Bullet Joe Bush as a pinch hitter in Game 3, played at Fenway Park. The walk came in the 12th inning, when the Braves won the game on Bush's throwing error one batter after Gilbert.

== Managing career ==
Gilbert became more famous as a minor league manager in the Southern Association, where he led teams for 25 seasons, including the New Orleans Pelicans from 1923 to 1931 and 1933–38 and the Nashville Vols from 1939 to 1948. He took 1932 off from his dugout duties to serve as president of the Pelicans, then was a part-owner of the Vols from 1939 through 1955. His managing career was bracketed by pennants. His New Orleans club posted 89 wins and a .610 winning percentage in 1923, and his final club, in Nashville, won 95 games but lost the 1948 playoff championship.

Gilbert won eight Southern Association championships during his quarter-century in the league, including six consecutive titles (1939–44) with the Vols. His clubs twice won 101 games (1926 with New Orleans and 1940 with Nashville). Gilbert's career record as a minor league skipper was 2,128 wins and 1,627 defeats (.567).

== Death and family ==
He died in New Orleans of undisclosed causes at age 73. He was the father of Charlie Gilbert, a National League outfielder from 1940 to 1943 and in 1946–47, and Tookie Gilbert, a minor league slugger with the Vols who had two trials with the New York Giants in the early 1950s.

== Other sources ==
- Obituary, The New York Times, February 18, 1965.
- Johnson, Lloyd, ed., The Minor League Register. Durham, North Carolina: Baseball America, 1994.
