= Tookie Gilbert =

American baseball player

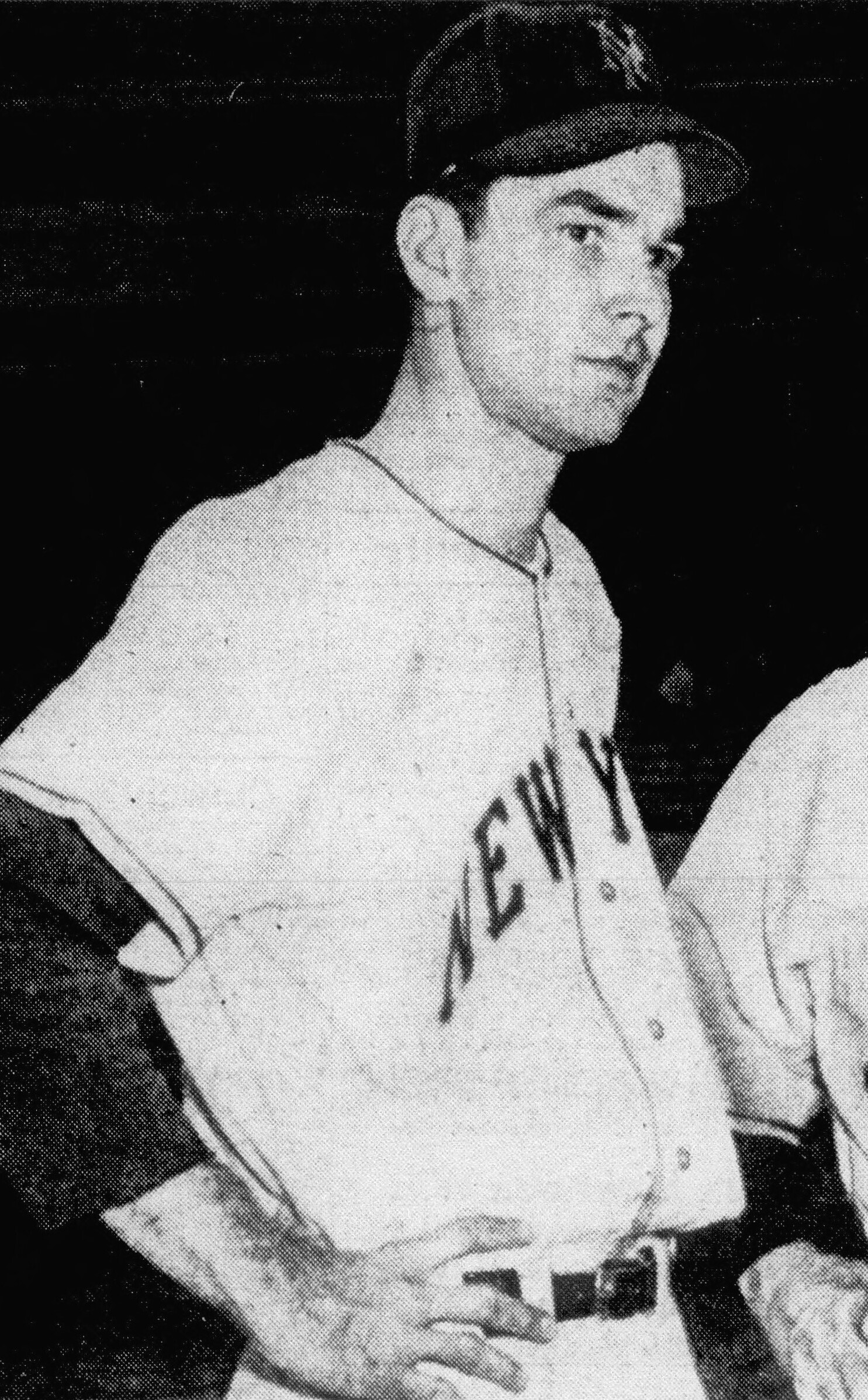
- Gilbert in 1950
- Outfielder / First baseman
- Born: April 4, 1929; New Orleans, Louisiana, U.S.
- Died: June 23, 1967 (aged 38); New Orleans, Louisiana, U.S.
- Batted: Left Threw: Right

MLB debut
- May 5, 1950, for the New York Giants

Last MLB appearance
- September 27, 1953, for the New York Giants

MLB statistics
- Batting average: .203
- Home runs: 7
- Runs batted in: 48
- Stats at Baseball Reference

Teams
- New York Giants (1950; 1953)

Harold Joseph "Tookie" Gilbert (April 4, 1929 – June 23, 1967) was an American first baseman who had two trials with the New York Giants of Major League Baseball. He was the son of former major league outfielder and longtime minor league manager Larry Gilbert, and the brother of Charlie Gilbert, also an outfielder. Tookie Gilbert, born in New Orleans, Louisiana, threw right-handed and batted left-handed and stood 6 feet 21/2 inches (1.9 m) tall and weighed 185 pounds (84 kg) during his playing career.

Gilbert was a formidable slugger during his minor league career in the Class AA Southern Association, where he played for the Nashville Vols, and led the American Association in homers with 29 in 1951 while a member of the Minneapolis Millers, but as a major leaguer he batted only .203 in 183 games played and 482 at bats in appearances for the 1950 and 1953 Giants. He hit seven home runs and knocked home 48 runs batted in as a Giant.

After his retirement from baseball, Gilbert was elected civil sheriff of Orleans Parish, Louisiana, in 1962. He died in New Orleans of an apparent heart attack while at the wheel of his car at the age of 38.

== See also ==
- List of second-generation Major League Baseball players
