= Buddy Gilbert =

American baseball player (born 1935)

- Right fielder
- Born: July 26, 1935 (age 91); Knoxville, Tennessee, U.S.
- Batted: Left Threw: Right

MLB debut
- September 9, 1959, for the Cincinnati Reds

Last MLB appearance
- September 27, 1959, for the Cincinnati Reds

MLB statistics
- Batting average: .150
- Home runs: 2
- Runs batted in: 2
- Stats at Baseball Reference

Teams
- Cincinnati Reds (1959)

Drew Edward "Buddy" Gilbert (born July 26, 1935) is an American former professional baseball player. An outfielder, he had a brief, seven-game trial with the 1959 Cincinnati Reds of Major League Baseball, collecting three hits in 20 at bats. Gilbert batted left-handed, threw right-handed, stood 6 feet 3 inches (1.91 m) tall and weighed 195 pounds (88 kg). He was born in Knoxville, Tennessee.

== Playing career ==
Gilbert attended Knoxville's Central High School and the University of Tennessee. He signed with Cincinnati in 1954 and played eight seasons in the Reds' farm system, through 1961. In his best campaign, he batted .282 with 24 home runs and 84 runs batted in for the 1959 Nashville Vols of the Double-A Southern Association. That performance earned his callup to the National League that September. Gilbert appeared in six games in right field, and although he registered no outfield assists, he won praise for his strong throwing arm by outgunning future Baseball Hall of Fame rightfielder Roberto Clemente in a throwing competition.

At the plate, his three hits included solo home runs against Jim Umbricht and Dick Hall of the Pittsburgh Pirates in the final two games of his career. He also had one single and three bases on balls in 23 plate appearances. His chances of making the 1960 Reds were diminished when Gilbert became involved in a salary dispute over $200 with Reds' general manager Gabe Paul. He spent the rest of his career in minor league baseball.

However, Gilbert made an impact earlier in his career, when as a minor-league teammate of outfielder Curt Flood in the Jim Crow South, he often brought food to Flood on the team bus. Because Flood was an African-American, he was legally prohibited from eating in whites-only, segregated restaurants. Gilbert later said, "Curt Flood mentioned in his autobiography that in all the years he played baseball there was one white boy from Knoxville, Tennessee, that always treated him like a human — Buddy Gilbert. That broke my heart. That’s the nicest compliment I think I have ever had in my lifetime.”

After retiring from baseball, Gilbert launched a successful banking and real estate career in Knoxville. He is a member of the Greater Knoxville Sports Hall of Fame.
