= Boots Poffenberger =

American baseball player (1915–1999)

- Boots Poffenberger, Detroit Tigers
- Pitcher
- Born: July 1, 1915; Williamsport, Maryland, U.S.
- Died: September 1, 1999 (aged 84); Williamsport, Maryland, U.S.
- Batted: Right Threw: Right

MLB debut
- June 11, 1937, for the Detroit Tigers

Last MLB appearance
- May 21, 1939, for the Brooklyn Dodgers

MLB statistics
- Win–loss record: 16–12
- Earned run average: 4.75
- Strikeouts: 65
- Stats at Baseball Reference

Teams
- Detroit Tigers (1937–1938); Brooklyn Dodgers (1939)

Cletus Elwood "Boots" Poffenberger (July 1, 1915 – September 1, 1999) was an American Major League Baseball pitcher for the Detroit Tigers (1937–1939) and Brooklyn Dodgers (1939).

== Promising rookie year in 1937 ==
Born in Williamsport, Maryland, Boots Poffenberger played for the Beaumont Exporters in 1937, with a record of 9–1. He was called up to the Tigers mid-season and went 10–5 as a rookie in 137 1/3 innings with an earned run average of 4.67. His won-loss percentage of .667 in 1937 was seventh best in the American League. He was also ninth best in the league in saves (3) and tenth in hit batsmen (4). Boots also fell for the "hidden ball trick" as a rookie, caught by Frank Crosetti on July 16, 1937.

== Off-field antics and problems with management ==
Boots was only 21 years old when he debuted with the Tigers, and his career spun out of control within two years. Baseball writer Joe Falls wrote that "Poffenberger aroused great expectations with a 10–5 season as a rookie in 1937, but his performance never approached the heights of his antics...He loved to live it up. In fact, some days he did not show up for work. He became known as the ‘Duke of Duckout'."

Stories about Poffenberger's late night drinking and poor training practices caused him to fall out of favor with the team. After a night of heavy drinking while on a road trip with the Tigers in 1937, Poffenberger called room service and said, "I'll have the breakfast of champions." When asked if he wanted cereal, Poffenberger replied, "Hell, no. Two fried eggs and a bottle of beer."

Later, Boots was interviewed on a radio program sponsored by a cereal company. When it came time for the commercial plug, the interviewer asked, "Now, tell us, Boots, what is your favorite breakfast, taken with cream, sugar and some sort of fruit?" Ever the non-conformist, Boots refused to play along and responded, "Ham, eggs, and two bottles of beer."

After returning to the Tigers from a one-day "disappearance", manager Mickey Cochrane stood over him in the clubhouse and demanded to know his whereabouts. Boots replied: "I refuse to reveal my identity."

The Tigers eventually hired a detective to follow him. Owner Walter Briggs, Sr. tried to get Boots to change his ways by reciting everywhere Boots had gone and everything that Boots had done in the late hours. Boots asked Briggs how he knew about all of his activities, and Briggs explained he had hired a private detective. Boots said, "That's a waste of your money, Mr. Briggs. You ought to assign him to some other player. You know darn well what I'm going to do." Boots told Briggs he should give Boots the money he was giving to the detective and Boots would tell them where to go. "All they’d have to do was go to the beer joint closest to the ballpark."

== Boots' final years in the Major Leagues (1938–1939) ==
After a strong rookie season, Boots held out for more money. When he returned, he was not able to match the success of his rookie season, finishing the season with a 6–7 record. The Tigers sent him to the Toledo Mud Hens before the 1938 season was over.

In 1939, Poffenberger was claimed off waivers by the Brooklyn Dodgers. In May, Poffenberger was suspended by the Dodgers and fined $400 for breaking training rules. Boots pitched only five innings for the Dodgers before being sent to the minor leagues in Montreal. Poffenberger refused to report to Montreal (he asked to be sent to Beaumont instead, because he thought the night life was better) and was placed on the ineligible list for 1939.

In three seasons in the major leagues, Poffenberger won 16 games and lost 12 with an earned run average of 4.75.

== Minor league career with Nashville and San Diego ==
Though he never made it back to the big leagues, Boots had his best year in 1940 playing with the Nashville Vols in the Southern Association, a team that went 101–47 and has been ranked by MiLB.com as the 47th best team in minor league history. Poffenberger led the way with a 26–9 record for the 1940 Vols. Boots led the league in wins (the 2nd most was 18) and win percentage (.743).

Boots played for the Vols again in 1941 and was suspended for 90 days for throwing a ball at an umpire. During a game in Nashville, Poffenberger reportedly consumed "a few shots of gin" before taking the mound. He became angry at the umpire's calls and threw the ball at the umpire, resulting in the suspension. Boots later said of the umpire incident, "It just slipped up on me this time." In 1942, Boots moved on to the San Diego Padres of the Pacific Coast League.

== Later life ==
Boots joined the U.S. Marines and served in the South Pacific during World War II. His photograph was used on Marine recruiting posters. He returned to baseball in 1946 playing a final season for San Diego in the PCL.

Boots Poffenberger died in Williamsport, Maryland, in 1999 at age 84.

In 2003, actor Christopher Lloyd portrayed a character named "Dr. Cletus Poffenberger" (Boots' real first name was Cletus) on the television series Tremors.
