= Roy Schalk =

American baseball player (1908–1990)

- Second baseman
- Born: November 9, 1908; Chicago, Illinois, U.S.
- Died: March 11, 1990 (aged 81); Gainesville, Texas, U.S.
- Batted: Right Threw: Right

MLB debut
- September 17, 1932, for the New York Yankees

Last MLB appearance
- September 9, 1945, for the Chicago White Sox

MLB statistics
- Batting average: .233
- Home run: 2
- Runs batted in: 109
- Stats at Baseball Reference

Teams
- New York Yankees (1932); Chicago White Sox (1944–1945)

Le Roy John Schalk (November 9, 1908 – March 11, 1990) was an American baseball player and manager.

Schalk was not related to Chicago White Sox Hall of Fame catcher Ray Schalk, although both were from Illinois. After playing with unaffiliated minor league teams in Ottumwa, Iowa, Fairbury, Nebraska and Oklahoma City (where he hit .344 in 1932), the New York Yankees signed the second baseman, who joined the team in St. Louis on September 17. Starting three games at second (including both ends of a doubleheader on the 18th) against the hapless Browns, Schalk went 3-for-12 with a double. They would be his only games as a Yankee.

The following year, the Yanks assigned him to their top farm club in Newark; after bouncing around with minor-league clubs in Newark, Baltimore and Little Rock for a full decade, it looked like Schalk's big-league days were over. (Schalk played five years for Little Rock, even winning the Southern Association MVP Award in 1942.)

Then came World War II. After a year away from the game in 1943, his hometown White Sox—desperate for fresh bodies—signed the 35-year-old Schalk as their second baseman. After hitting only .220 that year (but playing solid defensively in 146 games), Schalk returned to the Sox lineup in 1945 and batted .248, leading the majors in sacrifice hits and even drawing some MVP votes. In 1946, when the top MLB stars headed back from the war, Schalk returned to Oklahoma City—this time as player/manager. Schalk was fired the following year but hooked on with the Brooklyn Dodgers' farm club in Newport News, Virginia, where he played and piloted the club in 1948-49. Finally, he took over the El Dorado, Arkansas Oilers in the Class C Cotton States League in 1950. Unfortunately, Schalk hardly found gold in El Dorado: the club finished deep in last place at 38-101. It was Schalk's last year in baseball.

Roy Schalk eventually relocated to Gainesville, Texas, where he died at the age 81 in 1990.
