= Chuck Coles (baseball) =

American baseball player (1931–1996)

- Outfielder
- Born: June 27, 1931; Fredericktown, Pennsylvania, U.S.
- Died: January 25, 1996 (aged 64); Myrtle Beach, South Carolina, U.S.
- Batted: Left Threw: Left

MLB debut
- September 19, 1958, for the Cincinnati Redlegs

Last MLB appearance
- September 28, 1958, for the Cincinnati Redlegs

MLB statistics
- Games played: 5
- At bats: 11
- Hits: 2
- Stats at Baseball Reference

Teams
- Cincinnati Redlegs (1958)

Charles Edward Coles (June 27, 1931 – January 25, 1996) was an American professional baseball player whose career extended from 1950 through 1963. He had a five-game trial in Major League Baseball as an outfielder and pinch hitter for the 1958 Cincinnati Redlegs. Coles was born in Fredericktown, Pennsylvania, and attended Waynesburg College. He threw and batted left-handed, stood 5 feet 9 inches (1.75 m) tall and weighed 180 pounds (82 kg).

His career began in the Brooklyn Dodgers' organization and was interrupted by military service in 1953–1954. Coles reached double figures in home runs in nine different minor-league seasons, exceeding 24 homers for three straight years (1956–1958). At the tail end of the last of those seasons, Coles was called up by the Redlegs from the Double-A Nashville Vols after he had smashed 29 homers, scored 117 runs, driven in 107, and batted .307 playing in offense-friendly Sulphur Dell. He led the Southern Association in runs batted in and was selected the circuit's All-Star first baseman.

In his five September 1958 appearances, Coles started four contests: three as left fielder and one as center fielder; he pinch hit in a fifth. He collected two hits, including a double, in 11 at bats (.182) and two runs batted in.

Coles died in Myrtle Beach, South Carolina, at 64 on January 25, 1996.
