= Gus Dugas =

Canadian baseball player (1907–1997)

- Outfielder
- Born: March 24, 1907; Saint-Jean-de-Matha, Quebec, Canada
- Died: April 14, 1997 (aged 90); Colchester, Connecticut, U.S.
- Batted: Left Threw: Left

MLB debut
- September 17, 1930, for the Pittsburgh Pirates

Last MLB appearance
- June 28, 1934, for the Washington Senators

MLB statistics
- Batting average: .206
- Home runs: 3
- Runs batted in: 23
- Stats at Baseball Reference

Teams
- Pittsburgh Pirates (1930, 1932); Philadelphia Phillies (1933); Washington Senators (1934)

Augustin Joseph "Gus" Dugas (March 24, 1907 – April 14, 1997) was a Canadian-born professional baseball outfielder. He played parts of four seasons in Major League Baseball (MLB) between 1930 and 1934, with the Pittsburgh Pirates, Philadelphia Phillies, and Washington Senators. Listed at 5 feet 9 inches (1.75 m) and 165 pounds (75 kg), he batted and threw left-handed.

== Biography ==
Dugas first played professionally in 1930, with the minor league Wichita Aviators, a Class A team in the Western League, batting .349 with 203 hits (including 23 home runs) in 143 games. In September, he made his major league debut, appearing in nine games with the Pittsburgh Pirates, batting .290 (9-for-31) with one run batted in (RBI). In April 1931, before appearing in any games with the Pirates, Dugas collided with shortstop Ben Sankey during a practice, suffering a broken jaw. After recuperating, Dugas spent the season with the Kansas City Blues, a Double-A team in the American Association, batting .419 with 137 hits in 93 games.

Dugas returned to MLB in 1932, playing in 55 games with the Pirates, batting .237 with three home runs and 12 RBIs. In December, he was traded to the Philadelphia Phillies, as part of a four-player deal involving the Pirates, Phillies, and New York Giants. During 1933, Dugas saw limited action with the Phillies, appeared in 37 games between mid-April and early August; he batted .169 with no home runs and nine RBIs. Defensively, he made the only non-outfield appearances of his major league career, playing 11 games as a first baseman. In August, Dugas was sent to the minor league Albany Senators of the American Association as the player to be named later from an earlier transaction for third baseman Jim McLeod. With Albany, Dugas batted .379 in 38 games through the end of the season.

In 1934, Dugas played for the Washington Senators from mid-April to late June; he appeared in 24 games, almost exclusively as a pinch hitter. He collected one hit in 19 at bats, for an .053 average. He spent the balance of the season with Albany, batting .371 in 57 games. In parts of four major league seasons with three teams, Dugas appeared in 125 games, batting .206 with three home runs and 23 RBIs. Defensively, he accrued a .926 fielding percentage in the outfield, and .984 at first base.

After 1934, Dugas appeared exclusively in the minor leagues, spending time with the Montreal Royals (1935–1938), Baltimore Orioles (1938–1939), Nashville Vols (1939–1942), Toronto Maple Leafs (1943), and one post-war season with the Providence Chiefs (1946). He appeared in over 1200 minor league games, during which he hit at least 175 home runs (records for the 1938 season are incomplete).

== Personal life ==
Dugas married Doris Buteau in October 1934; the couple settled in Norwich, Connecticut, and had four children. His draft registration card of October 1940 indicated that Dugas became a naturalized American citizen. Dugas was an inaugural member of the Norwich Sports Hall of Fame in 1968, and there is a "Lefty Dugas Drive" around Dodd Stadium in Norwich. in April 1977, Dugas was one of seven Quebec-born former MLB players who threw out ceremonial first pitches before the first Montreal Expos home game at Olympic Stadium. A great-grandchild, Andrew Carignan, played in MLB in 2011 and 2012.

Dugas died in April 1997, two weeks after suffering a stroke. In reporting his death, some reports referred to Dugas as "the first Canadian-born baseball player in the major leagues"; however, that distinction lies with Bob Addy, who played in the National Association in 1871.
