= Russ Meers =

American baseball player (1918–1994)

- Pitcher
- Born: November 28, 1918; Tilton, Illinois, U.S.
- Died: November 16, 1994 (aged 75); Lancaster, Pennsylvania, U.S.
- Batted: Left Threw: Left

MLB debut
- September 28, 1941, for the Chicago Cubs

Last MLB appearance
- September 26, 1947, for the Chicago Cubs

MLB statistics
- Win–loss record: 3–3
- Earned run average: 3.98
- Strikeouts: 35
- Stats at Baseball Reference

Teams
- Chicago Cubs (1941, 1946–1947)

Russell Harlan Meers (November 28, 1918 – November 16, 1994), nicknamed "Babe", was an American pitcher in Major League Baseball. He played for the Chicago Cubs in 1941, 1946–47.

Meers made his major league debut for the 1941 Chicago Cubs on the final day of the season. In 1942 he was sent down to the Milwaukee Brewers of the American Association. During the season, Meers joined the Navy where he spent more than three years serving during World War II in the Pacific Theater of Operations. Meers rejoined the Cubs after the war, pitching during the 1946 and 1947 seasons.
