= Red Nonnenkamp =

American baseball player (1911–2000)

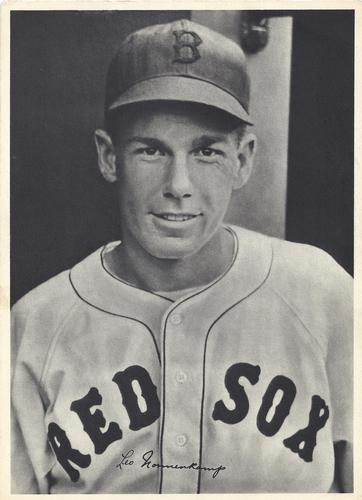
- Outfielder
- Born: July 7, 1911; St. Louis, Missouri, U.S.
- Died: December 3, 2000 (aged 89); Little Rock, Arkansas, U.S.
- Batted: Left Threw: Left

MLB debut
- September 6, 1933, for the Pittsburgh Pirates

Last MLB appearance
- June 5, 1940, for the Philadelphia Phillies

MLB statistics
- Batting average: .262
- Home runs: 0
- Runs batted in: 24
- Stats at Baseball Reference

Teams
- Pittsburgh Pirates (1933); Boston Red Sox (1938–1940)

Leo William "Red" Nonnenkamp (July 7, 1911 – December 3, 2000) was an American outfielder in Major League Baseball who played between 1933 and 1940 for the Pittsburgh Pirates (1933) and Boston Red Sox (1938–1940). Listed at 5 ft 11 in (1.80 m), 165 lb., Nonnenkamp batted and threw left-handed. He was born in St. Louis, Missouri.

In a four-season career, Nonnenkamp was a .262 hitter (69-for-263) with 49 runs and 24 RBI in 155 games, including six doubles, two triples, six stolen bases, and a .347 on-base percentage.

Nonnenkamp died at the age of 89 in Little Rock, Arkansas.
