= Hal Quick =

American baseball player (1917-1974)

- Shortstop
- Born: October 4, 1917; Rome, Georgia, U.S.
- Died: March 9, 1974 (aged 56); Swansea, Illinois, U.S.
- Batted: Right Threw: Right

MLB debut
- September 7, 1939, for the Washington Senators

Last MLB appearance
- September 28, 1939, for the Washington Senators

MLB statistics
- Batting average: .244
- Home runs: 0
- Runs batted in: 2
- Stats at Baseball Reference

Teams
- Washington Senators (1939)

James Harold Quick (October 4, 1917 – March 9, 1974), nicknamed "Blondie", was an American shortstop in Major League Baseball who played for the Washington Senators in the 1939 season.
