= Bob Kelly (baseball) =

American baseball player (1927–2024)

- Pitcher
- Born: October 4, 1927; Cleveland, Ohio, U.S.
- Died: November 27, 2024 (aged 97); Old Lyme, Connecticut, U.S.
- Batted: Right Threw: Right

MLB debut
- May 4, 1951, for the Chicago Cubs

Last MLB appearance
- June 4, 1958, for the Cleveland Indians

MLB statistics
- Win–loss record: 12–18
- Earned run average: 4.50
- Strikeouts: 146
- Stats at Baseball Reference

Teams
- Chicago Cubs (1951–1953); Cincinnati Redlegs (1953, 1958); Cleveland Indians (1958)

Robert Edward Kelly (October 4, 1927 – November 27, 2024) was an American Major League Baseball pitcher who played for three seasons for the Chicago Cubs from 1951 to 1953, the Cincinnati Redlegs in 1953 and 1958, and the Cleveland Indians in 1958. Kelly died in Old Lyme, Connecticut, on November 27, 2024, at the age of 97.

== Career ==
Kelly led East Cleveland Shaw High School to a state title in 1944, compiling a 7–2 record in 13 games with 75 strikeouts. He attended Purdue University, where he played college baseball for the Boilermakers from 1946 to 1947. Kelly also pitched collegiately for Western Reserve (now Case Western Reserve University) from 1948 to 1949. At the time of his death on November 27, 2024, Kelly was the last surviving Major Leaguer managed by Rogers Hornsby and Frankie Frisch. He was 97 years old.
