= Charlie English (baseball) =

American baseball player (1910–1999)

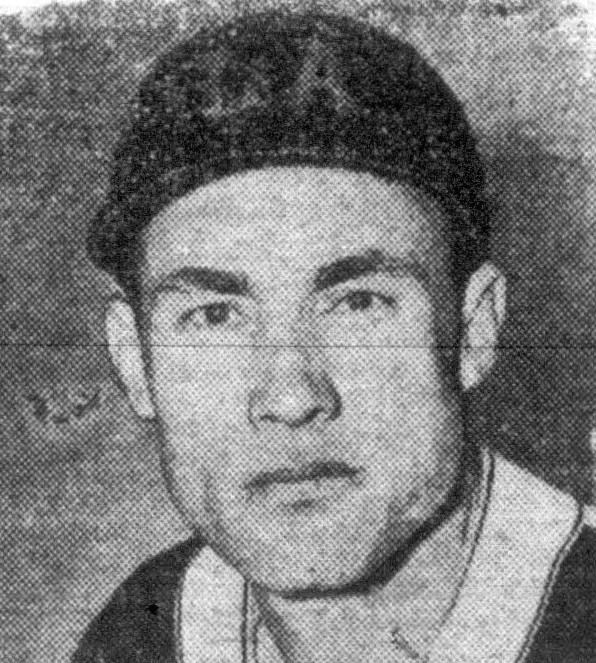
- English, circa 1943
- Third baseman
- Born: April 8, 1910; Darlington, South Carolina, U.S.
- Died: June 25, 1999 (aged 89); Pasadena, California, U.S.
- Batted: Right Threw: Right

MLB debut
- July 23, 1932, for the Chicago White Sox

Last MLB appearance
- October 3, 1937, for the Cincinnati Reds

MLB statistics
- Batting average: .287
- Home runs: 1
- Runs batted in: 13
- Stats at Baseball Reference

Teams
- Chicago White Sox (1932–1933); New York Giants (1936); Cincinnati Reds (1937)

Charles Dewie English (April 8, 1910 – June 25, 1999) was an American professional baseball third baseman in Major League Baseball who played for the Chicago White Sox, New York Giants and Cincinnati Reds in a span of four seasons from 1932 to 1937.
