= Bob Lennon =

American baseball player (1928–2005)

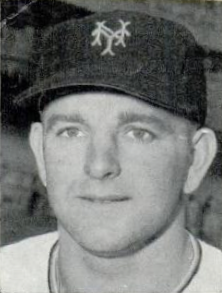
- Outfielder
- Born: September 15, 1928; Brooklyn, New York, U.S.
- Died: June 14, 2005 (aged 76); Dix Hills, New York, U.S.
- Batted: Left Threw: Left

MLB debut
- September 9, 1954, for the New York Giants

Last MLB appearance
- May 11, 1957, for the Chicago Cubs

MLB statistics
- Batting average: .165
- Home runs: 1
- Runs batted in: 4
- Stats at Baseball Reference

Teams
- New York Giants (1954, 1956); Chicago Cubs (1957)

Robert Albert Lennon (September 15, 1928 – June 14, 2005), nicknamed "Archie", was an American professional baseball player. Although Lennon struggled at the Major League level in three different trials during the mid-1950s, he was a prolific home run hitter in minor league baseball, hitting 278 homers in a 16-year career and setting the single-season home run record for the Double-A Southern Association when he belted 64 for the 1954 Nashville Vols.

An outfielder, Lennon was born in Brooklyn, New York; he threw and batted left-handed and was listed as 6 feet (1.8 m) tall and 200 pounds (91 kg). He signed with his hometown Brooklyn Dodgers in 1945. After three seasons in the low minors, he was acquired by the Dodgers' bitter rivals, the New York Giants, who became the parent club of the Vols in 1952.

The Vols played at Sulphur Dell, which was famous for its short right field fence — which was only 262 feet (80 m) from home plate. The park's dimensions favored pull-hitting, left-handed batters like Lennon, and he smashed 24 homers in his first year with Nashville, in 1953. The following season, he adjusted his swing and shattered the Southern Association home run record, clubbing 64 homers in 153 games played, which would stand as the SA's all-time record during its 61-year (1901–1961) history. He also knocked home a league-leading 161 runs batted in, won the Triple Crown by posting a .345 batting average, and led the league in runs scored (139) and hits (210). The breakout season led to Lennon's first MLB trial, as a late-season callup for the pennant-bound 1954 Giants.

Lennon did not stick with the 1955 Giants. He was sent to the Triple-A Minneapolis Millers of the American Association, where he hit 31 home runs and batted .280 with 104 RBI. The following season, he had his longest Major League stint with the 1956 Giants, appearing in 26 games, including 21 in the outfield, but he batted only .182 with one extra base hit, a double. He was then sent to the Chicago Cubs in an off-season trade, where he made his final appearances in MLB during the early weeks of the 1957 season. As a Cub, he hit his only Major League home run, in Brooklyn's Ebbets Field on April 30, 1957, a three-run shot off former Giant teammate Sal Maglie.

Lennon was reacquired by the Dodgers after that season, and played four more seasons of Triple-A baseball, including seasons of 28 and 27 home runs for the Montreal Royals of the International League. Lennon then retired after the 1961 season. As a minor leaguer, he batted .281 in 1,784 games, with 1,699 hits and 1,067 RBI to go with his 278 four-baggers.

In between, Lennon played winter with the Navegantes del Magallanes in Venezuela add the Cangrejeros de Santurce in Puerto Rico, appearing for them in the Caribbean Series in the 1955 and 1959 editions, respectively.

Bob Lennon died at age 76 in Dix Hills, New York.
