= Bob Schultz =

American baseball player (1923–1979)

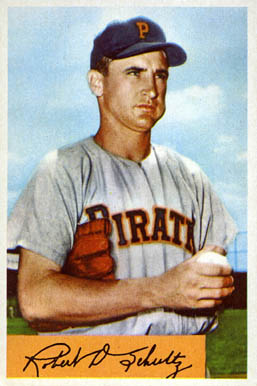
- Pitcher
- Born: November 27, 1923; Louisville, Kentucky, U.S.
- Died: March 31, 1979 (aged 55); Nashville, Tennessee, U.S.
- Batted: Right Threw: Left

MLB debut
- April 20, 1951, for the Chicago Cubs

Last MLB appearance
- April 15, 1955, for the Detroit Tigers

MLB statistics
- Win–loss record: 9–13
- Earned run average: 5.16
- Innings pitched: 183
- Stats at Baseball Reference

Teams
- Chicago Cubs (1951–1953); Pittsburgh Pirates (1953); Detroit Tigers (1955)

Robert Duffy Schultz (November 27, 1923 – March 31, 1979) was an American professional baseball player. A left-handed pitcher, his career extended for 11 seasons (1946–56), including a full season (1952) and parts of three others in Major League Baseball as a member of the Chicago Cubs, Pittsburgh Pirates and Detroit Tigers. Nicknamed "Bullet Bob", Schultz stood 6 feet 3 inches (1.91 m) tall and weighed 200 pounds (91 kg). The native of Louisville, Kentucky, served in the United States Army Air Forces during World War II.

Schultz came to the Major Leagues at age 27 after posting seasons of 20, 16 and 25 victories in minor league baseball. His 25-win season in 1950 was especially noteworthy as it came with the Nashville Vols of the Class AA Southern Association, who played their home games in a hitter's paradise called Sulphur Dell. Schultz lost only six decisions and finished second in the league in earned run average (2.68), just one one-hundredth of a point behind ERA champion Marv Rotblatt (2.67). Schultz broke camp with the 1951 Cubs out of spring training and appeared in 17 games — ten as a starting pitcher — during the season's early months, but he was sent back to the minors after his last start July 13, when he was knocked out of the box after only one full inning in a start against the Brooklyn Dodgers.

Schultz spent the entire 1952 campaign with the Cubs, working in 29 games and winning six of nine decisions. In his finest outing, September 14 at Braves Field, Schultz pitched a ten-inning complete game victory over the Boston Braves, allowing only two runs and six hits — and winning the game for himself with an RBI double. It would be his ninth and final victory in Major League Baseball.

In 1953, Schultz began the season with the Cubs but pitched infrequently and was included in a blockbuster trade to the Pirates on June 4 that netted the Cubs seven-time National League home run king Ralph Kiner. But he dropped all four MLB decisions that year, and spent part of the season, and all of 1954, with the Double-A New Orleans Pelicans. Back in the Southern Association, he won 27 games for the Pelicans over a season and a half, going 18–11 in 1954. The Tigers purchased his contract, but used him in only one game in 1955, in relief on April 15 against the Cleveland Indians. He surrendered three runs, all earned, on two hits and two bases on balls in 1 1/3 innings, and was sent back to the minors. He retired after the 1956 season. As a Major Leaguer, Schultz allowed 179 hits and 125 bases on balls in 183 innings of work, with 67 strikeouts. In the minors, he posted a 128–99 record in 345 games.

Settling in Nashville, Schultz became a house painter and continued to play semiprofessional baseball as well as softball. He was shot to death at age 55 after becoming embroiled in a late-night argument with another patron, 59-year-old Charles Johnson, in the bar of Nashville Veterans of Foreign Wars Post 3595. He was interred at Nashville National Cemetery on April 4, 1979, as a former private first class in the United States Marine Corps.
