= Charlie Gilbert =

American baseball player (1919–1983)

- Center fielder
- Born: July 8, 1919; New Orleans, Louisiana, U.S.
- Died: August 13, 1983 (aged 64); New Orleans, Louisiana, U.S.
- Batted: Left Threw: Left

MLB debut
- April 16, 1940, for the Brooklyn Dodgers

Last MLB appearance
- September 28, 1947, for the Philadelphia Phillies

MLB statistics
- Batting average: .229
- Home runs: 5
- Runs batted in: 55
- Stats at Baseball Reference

Teams
- Brooklyn Dodgers (1940); Chicago Cubs (1941–1943, 1946); Philadelphia Phillies (1946–1947)

Charles Mader Gilbert (July 8, 1919 – August 13, 1983) was an American professional baseball outfielder who appeared in 364 games, mostly as a center fielder, in Major League Baseball for the Brooklyn Dodgers (1940), Chicago Cubs (1941–1943 and 1946) and Philadelphia Phillies (1946–1947). He threw and batted left-handed and stood 5 feet 9 inches (1.75 m) tall and weighed 165 pounds (75 kg).

Born in New Orleans, Louisiana, he was the son of former MLB outfielder and longtime minor-league manager Larry Gilbert; his brother Tookie also played in the majors.

Charlie Gilbert served in the United States Navy in the Pacific Theatre of World War II. He joined the Dodgers in his second pro season, in 1940. In his third MLB game, on April 23, 1940, he hit a pair of home runs against the Boston Bees in an 8–3 Brooklyn victory at Ebbets Field. He thus became the first player, and one of three men in the history of the Dodgers' franchise, to have a multi-home-run game in his first five starts; the others are Cody Bellinger and Yasiel Puig.

He died at age 64 in New Orleans. Gilbert's daughter Jan went on the memorialize her late father in Goodbye, Dad, a series of mixed-media works utilizing family photographs.
