= Dutch McCall =

American baseball player (1920–1996)

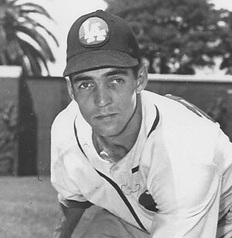
- Pitcher
- Born: December 27, 1920; Columbia, Tennessee, U.S.
- Died: January 8, 1996 (aged 75); Little Rock, Arkansas, U.S.
- Batted: Left Threw: Left

MLB debut
- April 27, 1948, for the Chicago Cubs

Last MLB appearance
- October 3, 1948, for the Chicago Cubs

MLB statistics
- Win–loss record: 4–13
- Earned run average: 4.82
- Strikeouts: 89
- Stats at Baseball Reference

Teams
- Chicago Cubs (1948)

Robert Leonard "Dutch" McCall (December 27, 1920 – January 8, 1996) was an American pitcher in Major League Baseball. He played for the Chicago Cubs.

During World War II, McCall served in the United States Army rising to the rank of corporal. He is buried in the Little Rock National Cemetery (Section 24).
