= Tiny Chaplin =

American baseball player (1905–1939)

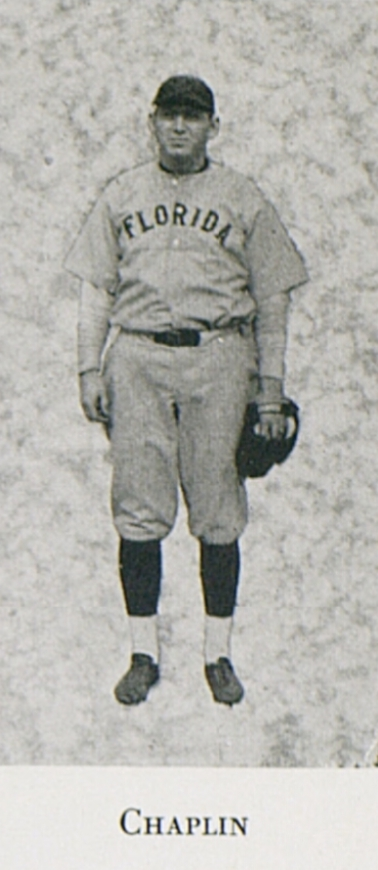
- Pitcher
- Born: July 13, 1905; Los Angeles, California, U.S.
- Died: March 25, 1939 (aged 33); National City, California, U.S.
- Batted: Right Threw: Right

MLB debut
- April 13, 1928, for the New York Giants

Last MLB appearance
- September 27, 1936, for the Boston Bees

MLB statistics
- Win–loss record: 15–23
- Earned run average: 4.25
- Strikeouts: 118
- Stats at Baseball Reference

Teams
- New York Giants (1928, 1930–1931); Boston Bees (1936)

James Bailey Chaplin (July 13, 1905 – March 25, 1939), nicknamed Tiny Chaplin, was an American professional baseball player. He played in Major League Baseball as a right-handed pitcher. He played four seasons with the New York Giants (1928, 1930–31) and the Boston Bees (1936). Chaplin died in an auto accident in National City, California on March 25, 1939. The previous two seasons he had played for the PCL San Diego Padres, where he was a teammate of Ted Williams.

== See also ==
- Florida Gators
- List of Florida Gators baseball players
