= Joe Dwyer =

American baseball player (1903–1992)

- Pinch hitter
- Born: March 27, 1903; Orange, New Jersey, U.S.
- Died: October 21, 1992 (aged 89); Glen Ridge, New Jersey, U.S.
- Batted: Left Threw: Left

MLB debut
- April 20, 1937, for the Cincinnati Reds

Last MLB appearance
- May 17, 1937, for the Cincinnati Reds

MLB statistics
- Batting average: .273 (3-for-11)
- Runs scored: 2
- Runs batted in: 1
- Games played: 12
- Stats at Baseball Reference

Teams
- Cincinnati Reds (1937)

Joseph Michael Dwyer (March 27, 1903 – October 21, 1992) was an American pinch hitter in Major League Baseball. He played for the Cincinnati Reds.
