= Ted Cieslak =

American baseball player

- Third baseman
- Born: November 22, 1912; Milwaukee, Wisconsin, U.S.
- Died: May 9, 1993 (aged 80); Milwaukee, Wisconsin, U.S.
- Batted: Right Threw: Right

MLB debut
- April 18, 1944, for the Philadelphia Phillies

Last MLB appearance
- September 26, 1944, for the Philadelphia Phillies

MLB statistics
- Batting average: .245
- Home runs: 2
- Runs batted in: 11
- Stats at Baseball Reference

Teams
- Philadelphia Phillies (1944)

Thaddeus Walter Cieslak (November 22, 1912 – May 9, 1993) was an American Major League Baseball third baseman who played for the Philadelphia Phillies in 1944. The 27-year-old rookie stood 5 ft 10 in (1.78 m) and weighed 175 lbs.

Cieslak was one of many ballplayers who only appeared in the major leagues during World War II. He made his major-league debut on April 18, 1944, in a home game against the Brooklyn Dodgers at Shibe Park.

In 85 games, he was 54-for-220 (.245), and 21 walks and one hit-by-pitch pushed his on-base percentage up to .314. He had two home runs, 11 runs batted in, and scored 18 runs. Cieslak made 15 errors in 122 total chances (.877). In five of his games Cieslak was a left fielder, and handled 12 chances without making an error.

He died in his hometown of Milwaukee, Wisconsin at the age of 80.
