= Les Fleming =

American baseball player (1915–1980)

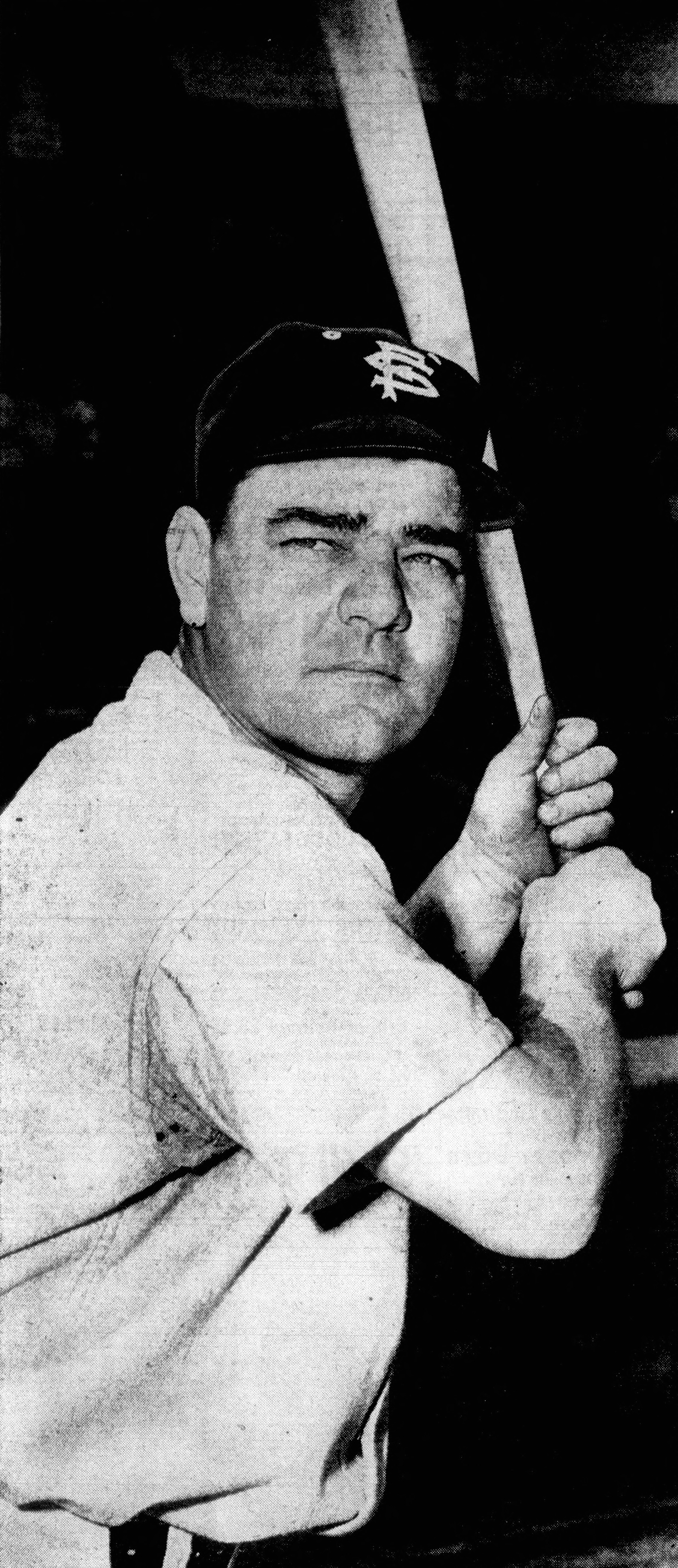
- Fleming in 1950
- First baseman
- Born: August 7, 1915; Singleton, Texas, U.S.
- Died: March 5, 1980 (aged 64); Cleveland, Texas, U.S.
- Batted: Left Threw: Left

MLB debut
- April 22, 1939, for the Detroit Tigers

Last MLB appearance
- June 9, 1949, for the Pittsburgh Pirates

MLB statistics
- Batting average: .277
- Home runs: 29
- Runs batted in: 199
- Stats at Baseball Reference

Teams
- Detroit Tigers (1939); Cleveland Indians (1941–1942, 1945–1947); Pittsburgh Pirates (1949)

Leslie Harvey Fleming (August 7, 1915 – March 5, 1980) was an American professional baseball first baseman whose 20-year career included all or parts of seven seasons in Major League Baseball as a member of the Detroit Tigers (1939), Cleveland Indians (1941–1942 and 1945–1947), and Pittsburgh Pirates (1949). Born in Singleton, a small community in Grimes County, Texas, he stood 5 feet 10 inches (1.78 m) tall, weighed 185 pounds (84 kg), and threw and batted left-handed.

Fleming's professional playing career lasted from 1935 through 1956; he did not play during the 1943 and 1944 wartime seasons. During his MLB tenure, he appeared in 434 games, and batted .277 with 199 runs batted in. His 369 hits included 69 doubles, 15 triples and 29 home runs. In 1942, as Cleveland's regular first baseman, he set personal bests in games played (156, tied for the American League lead), and most offensive categories. During his long career in minor league baseball, he was selected the Most Valuable Player of the 1948 American Association. In 1950, he knocked in 138 runs in the Pacific Coast League, another Triple-A circuit, but finished 18 RBI behind the league's leader, Harry Simpson.

As a member of the Indians during the 1947 season, Fleming became a teammate of Larry Doby when Doby broke the color barrier in the American League on July 5. On that day the Indians were preparing for a match against the Chicago White Sox at Comiskey Park. Fleming was one of the Indians who turned his back to Doby when player-manager Lou Boudreau introduced Doby to his new Indians' teammates in the clubhouse before the game.
