= Babe Barna =

American baseball player (1915–1972)

- Left fielder
- Born: March 2, 1915; Clarksburg, West Virginia, U.S.
- Died: May 18, 1972 (aged 57); Charleston, West Virginia, U.S.
- Batted: Left Threw: Right

MLB debut
- September 16, 1937, for the Philadelphia Athletics

Last MLB appearance
- July 28, 1943, for the Boston Red Sox

MLB statistics
- Batting average: .232
- Home runs: 12
- Runs batted in: 96
- Stats at Baseball Reference

Teams
- Philadelphia Athletics (1937–1938); New York Giants (1941–1943); Boston Red Sox (1943)

Herbert Paul "Babe" Barna (March 2, 1915 – May 18, 1972) was an American left fielder in Major League Baseball who played for the Philadelphia Athletics (1937–1938), New York Giants (1941–1943) and Boston Red Sox (1943). Barna batted left-handed and threw right-handed. He was born in Clarksburg, West Virginia, and attended West Virginia University, where he played football, basketball and college baseball for the Mountaineers from 1935 to 1937. He was selected in the seventh round of the 1937 NFL draft.

In a five-season career, Barna was a .232 hitter with 12 home runs and 96 RBI in 207 games played. His best season statistically was 1942, when he posted 85 hits, seven triples, six home runs, 39 runs, 58 RBI, 104 games – all career-highs. He was inducted into the West Virginia University Sports Hall of Fame in 1996.

Barna died in Charleston, West Virginia, at the age of 57.
