= Stan Palys =

American baseball player (1930–2021)

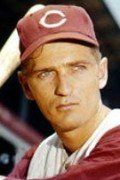
- Palys with the Cincinnati Redlegs in 1956
- Outfielder
- Born: May 1, 1930; Blakely, Pennsylvania, U.S.
- Died: February 8, 2021 (aged 90); Jupiter, Florida, U.S.
- Batted: Right Threw: Right

Professional debut
- MLB: September 20, 1953, for the Philadelphia Phillies
- NPB: March 14, 1964, for the Tokyo Orions

Last appearance
- MLB: September 25, 1956, for the Cincinnati Redlegs
- NPB: October 17, 1967, for the Tokyo Orions

MLB statistics
- Batting average: .237
- Home runs: 10
- Runs batted in: 38

NPB statistics
- Batting average: .275
- Home runs: 66
- Runs batted in: 253
- Stats at Baseball Reference

Teams
- Philadelphia Phillies (1953–1955); Cincinnati Redlegs (1955–1956); Tokyo Orions (1964–1967)

Stanley Francis Palys (May 1, 1930 – February 8, 2021) was an American Major League Baseball outfielder. He was born in Blakely, Pennsylvania. He appeared in 138 games over all or parts of four seasons in the majors, from 1953 through 1956, for the Philadelphia Phillies and Cincinnati Redlegs. He threw and batted right-handed, and was listed as 6 feet 2 inches (1.88 m) tall and 190 pounds (86 kg) during his playing career.

== Early life and education ==
Of Polish descent, Palys was born in a small town called Blakely, Pennsylvania on May 1, 1930. His parents, Genevieve and Francis, also gave birth to his three siblings, Mae, Henry, and Walter. In his high school career, he hit grew to a height of 6 feet 2 inches (1.88 m) and a weight of 190 pounds (86 kg). As one of the taller and more athletic students at his school, Palys was interested in playing football for the Blakely Bears, the two-time undefeated champions of Eastern Pennsylvania at the time. However, Palys never ended up playing high school football because his father, Francis, rejected the idea, even after the coaches came to his house in desperation.

== Professional baseball career ==
=== Philadelphia Phillies ===
Stan Palys made his MLB debut in 1955 after the parent Philadelphia Phillies brought him up to play with their professional team.

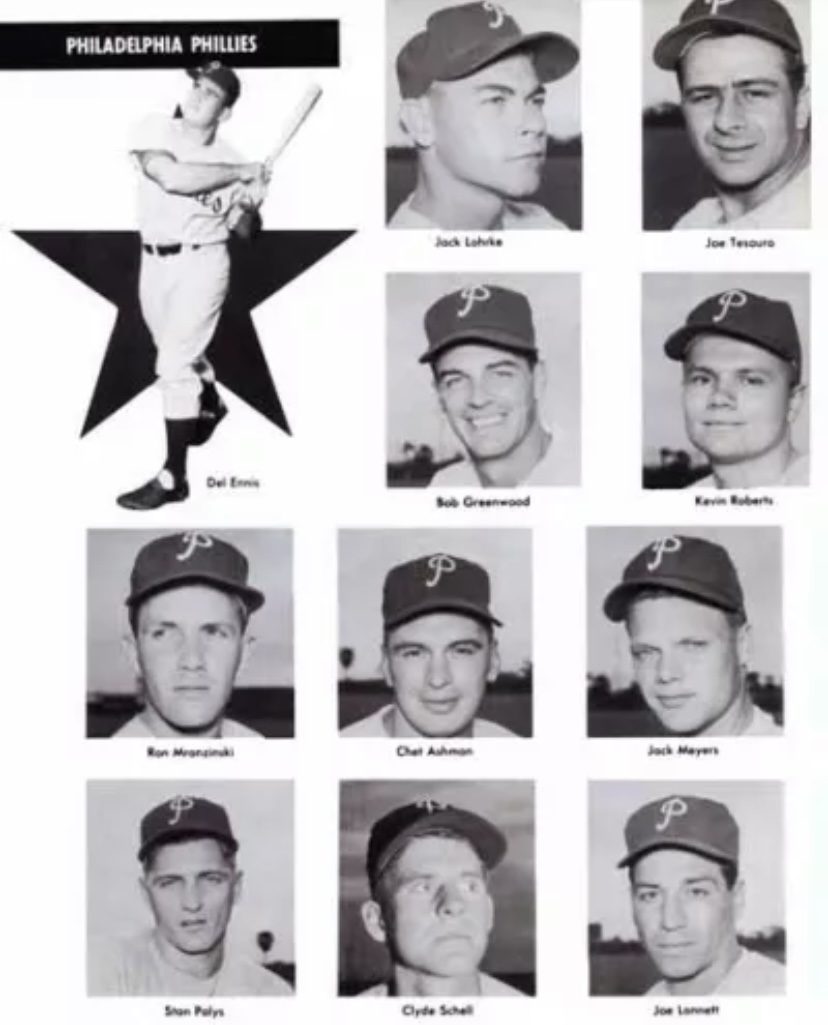
Palys pictured bottom left alongside some players from Philadelphia Phillies baseball team of the time

=== Cincinnati Redlegs ===
Of Polish descent, Palys signed with the Phillies before the 1950 professional baseball season and made his MLB debut in September 1953 after an All-Star campaign in the Class A Western International League. After another late-season audition in 1954, he made the majors for the full 1955 and 1956 campaigns. After starting 15 April games as a left fielder and right fielder for the 1955 Phillies and batting .288 with 15 hits, he was included in a six-player trade to Cincinnati on April 30 and became the Redlegs' semi-regular left fielder. He was plagued by injury, however, and batted only .230 for Cincinnati. The following year, 1956, saw the emergence of eventual Baseball Hall of Famer Frank Robinson, who took control of the Redlegs' left-field job and was voted National League Rookie of the Year. Palys played ten games in the outfield, 40 in all, and hit .226 in his last big-league season. He finished his MLB career with 79 hits, including 17 doubles, ten home runs and 38 runs batted in, batting .237 lifetime.

Palys continued to play in the minor leagues through 1963. He put up several seasons in the Double-A Southern Association, winning two batting titles (in 1957 and 1960). On July 7, 1963, while playing for the Triple-A Hawaii Islanders, Palys made the final out in a no-hitter thrown by Spokane Indians pitcher Bob Radovich. With two out in the ninth inning, an Islander player, Ron Samford, drew a walk. Palys came in to run for Samford. The next batter hit a grounder to first and Palys danced up and down until the ball hit him in the leg. Under baseball rules, a base hit is recorded for the batter and the baserunner declared out if the latter is struck by a ball in fair territory. Pacific Coast League president Dewey Soriano, who was in attendance that night, notified the press box that the final out was to be credited to the first baseman and that Palys' conduct constituted "unsportsmanlike play". (Apparently, no base hit was credited.)

Palys then completed his professional career with four seasons (1964–67) in Nippon Professional Baseball, belting 66 home runs in 446 total games, including 25 during 1965. He died on February 8, 2021, at the age of 90.
