= Greek George =

American baseball player (1912–1999)

- Catcher
- Born: December 25, 1912; Waycross, Georgia, U.S.
- Died: August 15, 1999 (aged 86); Metairie, Louisiana, U.S.
- Batted: Right Threw: Right

MLB debut
- June 30, 1935, for the Cleveland Indians

Last MLB appearance
- September 3, 1945, for the Philadelphia Athletics

MLB statistics
- Batting average: .177
- Home runs: 0
- Runs batted in: 24
- Stats at Baseball Reference

Teams
- Cleveland Indians (1935–1936); Brooklyn Dodgers (1938); Chicago Cubs (1941); Philadelphia Athletics (1945)

Charles Peter "Greek" George (December 25, 1912 – August 15, 1999) was an American catcher in Major League Baseball. He played from 1935 to 1945. He attended college at Oglethorpe University. He was suspended for punching an umpire during a game in 1945 and never played again in the big leagues.
