= Ed Sauer =

American baseball player (1919–1988)

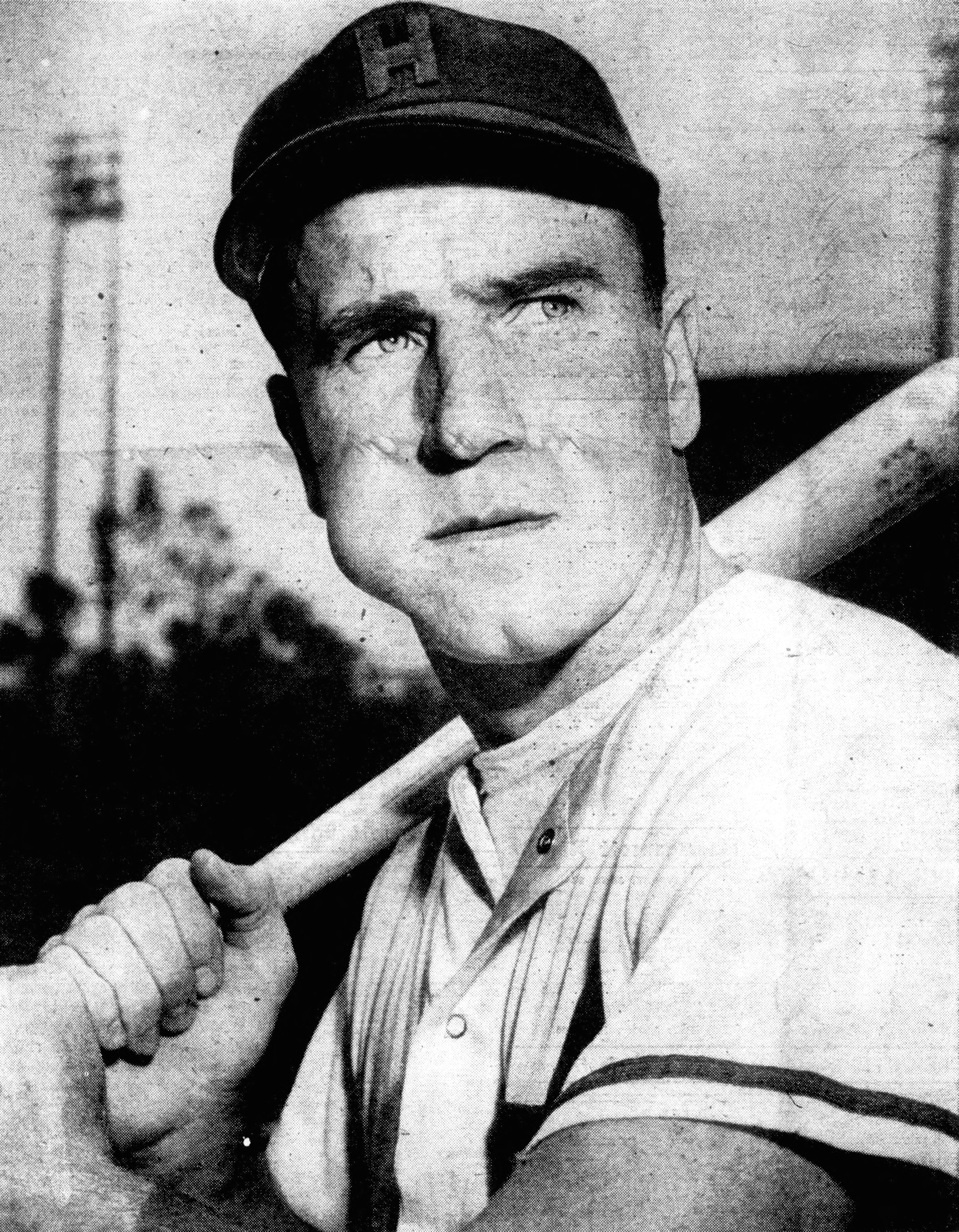
- Sauer, circa 1950
- Outfielder
- Born: January 3, 1919; Pittsburgh, Pennsylvania, U.S.
- Died: July 1, 1988 (aged 69); Thousand Oaks, California, U.S.
- Batted: Right Threw: Right

MLB debut
- September 17, 1943, for the Chicago Cubs

Last MLB appearance
- October 2, 1949, for the Boston Braves

MLB statistics
- Batting average: .256
- Home runs: 5
- Runs batted in: 57
- Stats at Baseball Reference

Teams
- Chicago Cubs (1943–1945); St. Louis Cardinals (1949); Boston Braves (1949)

Edward Sauer (January 3, 1919 – July 1, 1988) was an American professional baseball player. An outfielder, he appeared in 189 Major League games in 1943–1945 and in 1949 for the Chicago Cubs, St. Louis Cardinals and Boston Braves.

He stood 6 feet (1.8 m) tall, weighed 188 pounds (85 kg) and threw and batted right-handed.

== Early life and education ==
The younger brother of slugger Hank Sauer, Edward Sauer was born in Pittsburgh, Pennsylvania on January 3, 1919. He attended Elon College.

== Career ==
Sauer's pro career extended for a dozen years, from 1940 through 1951. He was a member of the pennant-winning 1945 Cubs and appeared as a pinch hitter twice (in games 5 and 7) during the 1945 World Series, striking out each time against Baseball Hall of Fame left-handed pitcher Hal Newhouser.

During his Major League career, Sauer collected 117 hits, including 25 doubles, two triples and five home runs.
