= Southern Association =

Minor league baseball league that operated from 1901 to 1961

- Most recent season or competition: 1961 Southern Association season
- Classification: Double-A (1946–1961); Class A1 (1936–1945); Class A (1905–1935); Class B (1902–1904)
- Sport: Baseball
- Founded: 1901 (125 years ago)
- Folded: 1961 (65 years ago)
- No. of teams: 13
- Country: United States
- Lastchampion: Chattanooga Lookouts (1961)

The Southern Association (SA) was a higher-level minor league in American organized baseball from 1901 through 1961. For most of its existence, the Southern Association was two steps below the Major Leagues; it was graded Class B (1902-1904), Class A (1905–1935), Class A1 (1936–1945), and Double-A (1946–1961). Although the SA was known as the Southern League through 1919, the later Double-A Southern League was not descended from the Southern Association; the modern SL came into existence in 1964 as the successor to the original South Atlantic ("Sally") League.

A stable, eight-team loop, the Southern Association's member teams typically included the Atlanta Crackers, Birmingham Barons, Chattanooga Lookouts, Little Rock Travelers, Memphis Chicks, Nashville Vols, and New Orleans Pelicans. The eighth club was usually either the Knoxville Smokies, Mobile Bears, or Shreveport Sports.

The Association was formed from the remnants of the Southern League (1885–1899) by Abner Powell, Newt Fisher, and Charley Frank.

== Resisted integration ==
After Jackie Robinson broke the color barrier in 1946 with the Montreal Royals of the International League, the Southern Association continued to adhere to the Jim Crow segregation laws of the time. Only one African-American ever played a meaningful game during this time: Nat Peeples of the 1954 Atlanta Crackers, the only black player in the league's history. On April 9–10, 1954, Peeples played in two road games in Mobile, and went hitless in four at bats. He was demoted to the already-integrated, Single-A Jacksonville Braves of the Sally League before the Crackers played a home game.

The Southern Association then played the rest of its history, through the end of 1961, as a racially segregated league. Partly due to this, its Major-League parent clubs were among the last to integrate during the 1950s, a period when African-Americans and Latin-American players of African descent were beginning to dominate Major League Baseball. By the end of the 1950s, the SA was the target of a boycott by activists of the Civil Rights Movement.

== Disbanded in 1961 ==
In its last three years, the Southern Association was plagued by frequent franchise shifts. Little Rock moved to Shreveport after the 1958 season, and New Orleans moved to Little Rock after the 1959 season. Memphis' park burned down just before the 1960 season, forcing the Chicks to play in several temporary facilities before moving to Macon, Georgia, for 1961. The league finally ceased operation after the 1961 season.

Member cities slowly began to join remaining leagues, which were racially integrated. The Atlanta club moved up to the Triple-A International League in 1962. Little Rock followed suit (as the renamed Arkansas Travelers), moving to the International circuit in 1963 and the Pacific Coast League from 1964 to 1965, before making a permanent home in the Double-A Texas League in 1966. Macon, a longtime member of the Sally League, returned to that circuit in 1962. After a one-year hiatus, Nashville and Chattanooga joined the Sally League in 1963. Later in the decade, Birmingham (1964) and Mobile (1966) joined the Southern League, and Memphis and Shreveport (both in 1968) entered the Texas circuit.

== Member teams ==
- Atlanta Crackers (1902–1961) – at times known as the Firemen and various other names depending on which newspaper was covering them
- Birmingham Barons (1901–1961) – at times known as the Iron Barons
- Chattanooga Lookouts (1901–1902; 1910–1943; 1944–1961)
- Knoxville Smokies (1931–1944)
- Little Rock Travelers (1901–1909; 1915–1956; 1957-1958; 1960–1961)
- Macon Peaches (1961)
- Memphis Chicks (1901–1960) – short for "Chickasaws" and at times known as the Turtles and Egyptians
- Mobile Bears (1908–1931; 1944–1961) – known as the Marines in 1931
- Montgomery Rebels (1903–1914; 1943; 1956) – at times known as the Black Sox, Senators, Climbers, and Billikens
- Nashville Vols (1901–1961)
- New Orleans Pelicans (1901–1959)
- Selma Christians (1901)
- Shreveport Sports (1901–1907; 1959–1961) – at times known as the Giants and Pirates
Southern Association team locations

== Champions ==
While a league pennant winner was crowned each season, some seasons (1928 and 1932–61) also concluded with either the top two or four teams in the league competing in playoffs to determine a league champion. These playoffs varied between being best-of-five and best-of-seven contests. The Atlanta Crackers, termed by some the "New York Yankees of the minors," won the Southern Association pennant 13 times, the most among all teams. They are followed by the New Orleans Pelicans, with nine pennants. As far as playoff championships are concerned, the Nashville Vols captured the most, with nine—dominating the league with six straight championships from 1939 to 1944. They are followed by Atlanta, with six playoff titles. Combining both pennants and playoffs, the Crackers won the most (21), with the Vols trailing them with 17. On the other hand, the Chattanooga Lookouts, charter members of the association, won only one title during their 54 years in the league—with that coming during the Southern Association's final, 1961 campaign.

== Most Valuable Player Award ==
The Most Valuable Player Award was given to honor the best player in the league from 1936 to 1961.

== Southern Professional Football League ==
In both 1940 and 1944 league leaders tried to start a minor football league, with plan to draw crowds of 15,000 to 20,000, but both attempts were cancelled at the early stages.
