= List of Nashville Sounds coaches =

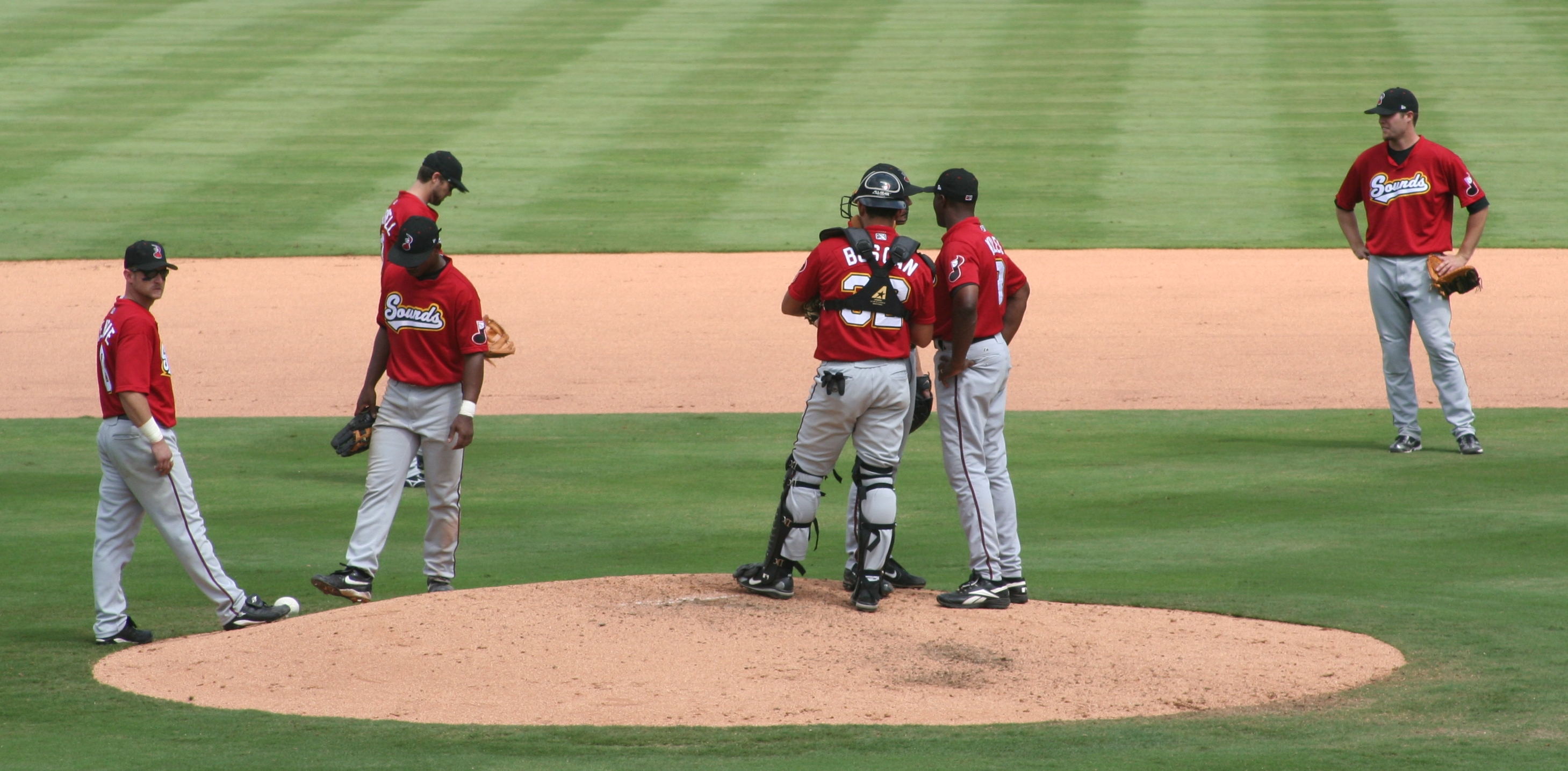
Pitching coach Stan Kyles meets with the Sounds' battery of Justin Lehr and J. C. Boscán on the mound.

The Nashville Sounds Minor League Baseball team has played in Nashville, Tennessee, since being established in 1978 as an expansion team of the Double-A Southern League. They moved up to Triple-A in 1985 as members of the American Association before joining the Pacific Coast League in 1998. With the restructuring of the minor leagues in 2021, they were placed in the Triple-A East, which became the International League in 2022. In the 2026 season, the Sounds' coaching staff was led by manager Rick Sweet and included Eric Bunnell, Tim Doherty (hitting), Zack Jones (hitting), Bryan Leslie (pitching), Tyler Thornburg (pitching), and David Tufo (bench).

Seven former Sounds players later served as coaches for the team. Wayne Garland of the 1982 starting rotation returned as pitching coach from 1987 to 1988. Don Cooper, a relief pitcher in 1980, coached the pitching staff from 1994 to 1996. Steve Wilson retired from the Sounds during the 1995 season and became the team's pitching coach. Fred Dabney, who pitched out of the bullpen in 1993, returned to coach pitchers from 2012 to 2014. Éric Gagné, who made two major league rehabilitation starts in 2008, served as bullpen coach in 2019. Jim Henderson, a reliever from 2011 to 2012 and in 2014, returned to the Sounds as pitching coach in 2021. Tyler Thornburg, part of Nashville's starting rotation from 2012 to 2013, became a pitching coach in 2026. Outfielder Gene Roof (1986) and catcher Buddy Pryor (1987) were player-coaches who coached hitting while playing on the team. Two coaches also managed the Nashville club. Pitching coach Wayne Garland filled in as interim manager for three games in 1988 after the dismissal of manager Jack Lind. Richie Hebner, who was the hitting coach from 1998 to 2000, became the team's manager for the second half of the 2000 season after Trent Jewett was hired as the third base coach for the Pittsburgh Pirates. Four coaches were selected to participate in the Triple-A All-Star Game: Stan Kyles (2006), Rich Gale (2011), Bob Skube (2014), and Rick Rodriguez (2017).

Pat Dobson's 1980 to 1981 pitching staffs had a 3.18 earned run average (ERA), the lowest recorded under all pitching coaches. Darold Knowles (2001–2004) and Stan Kyles (2005–2008) are the longest-tenured pitching coaches, having each served four full seasons. Hitting coach Sandy Guerrero (2009–2011) led his hitters to batting averages of .276, the highest under all hitting coaches. Al LeBoeuf (2012, 2021–2024), who coached hitting for five seasons, is the longest-serving hitting coach.

== Coaches ==
Key
No.	A running total of the number of Sounds coaches. Thus, any coach who has two or more separate terms is only counted once.
W%	Team winning percentage: number of wins divided by number of games coached in the regular-season
ERA	Team earned run average: earned runs divided by innings pitched times nine
SO	Team strikeouts
BA	Team batting average: hits divided by at bats
HR	Team home runs
RBI	Team runs batted in
*	Player-coach
†	All-Star while coaching the Sounds

=== Pitching ===
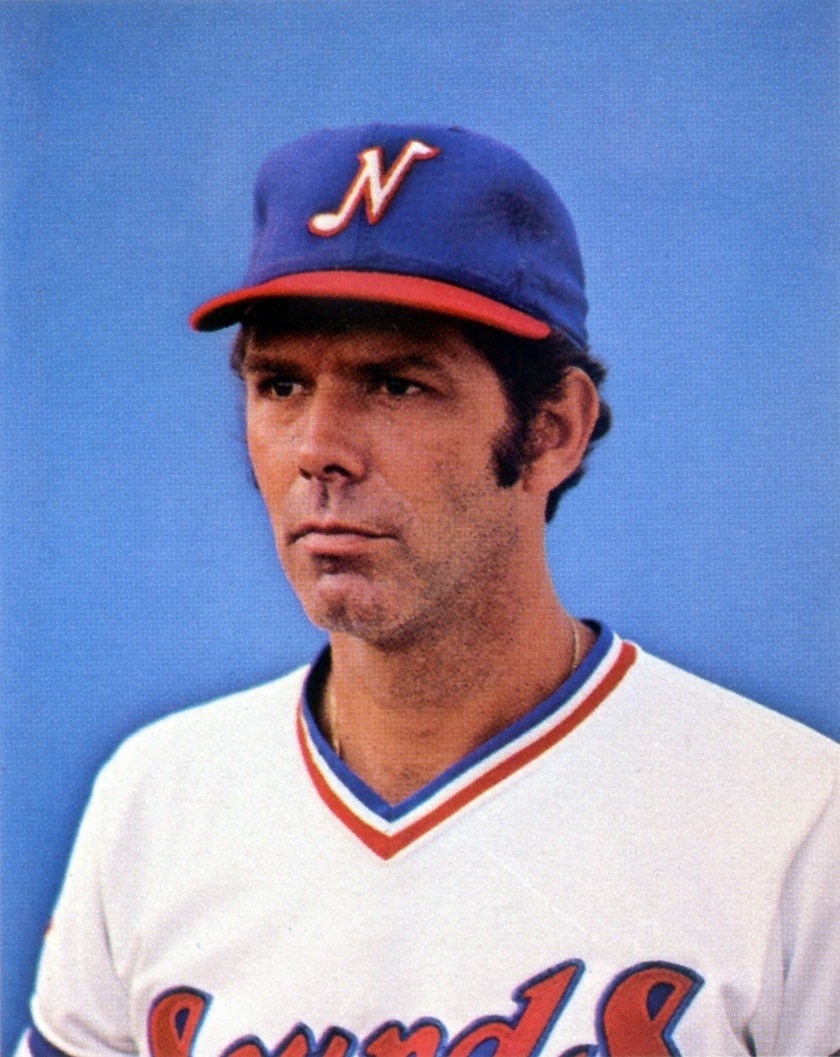
Pat Dobson's 1980 to 1981 pitching staffs had a 3.18 ERA, the lowest under all pitching coaches.

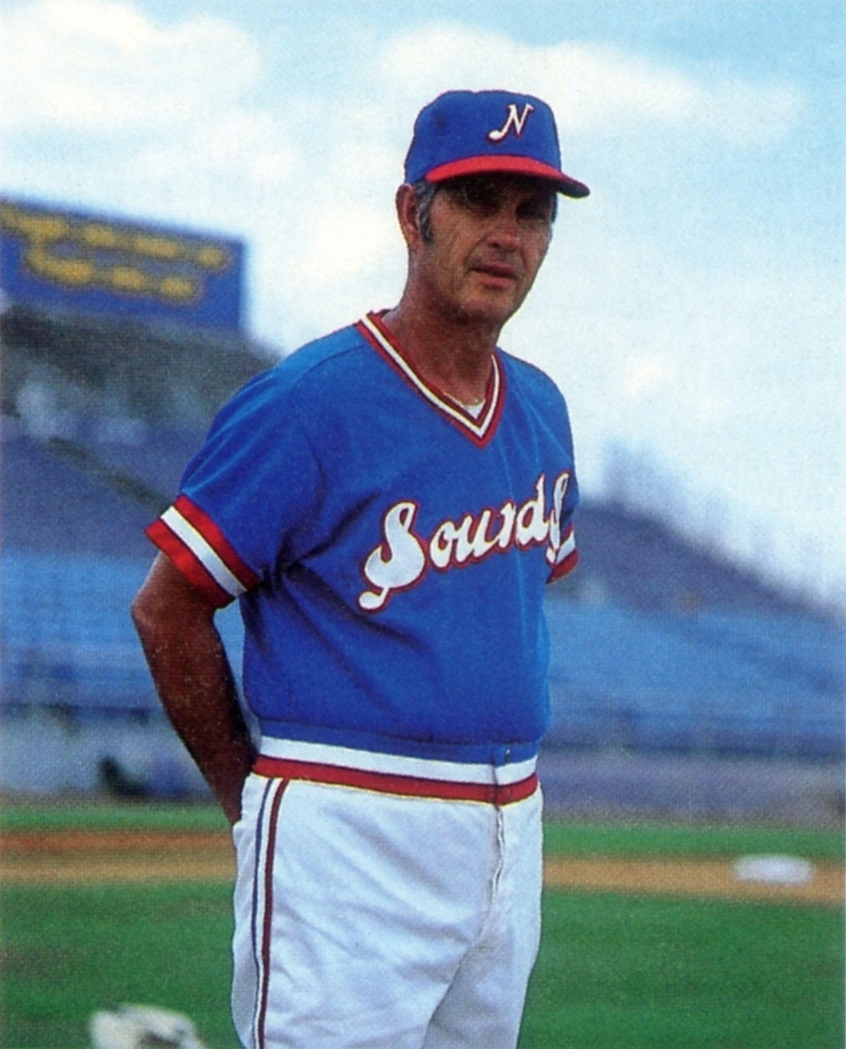
Hoyt Wilhelm, pitching coach from 1982 to 1984, was inducted in the National Baseball Hall of Fame in 1985.

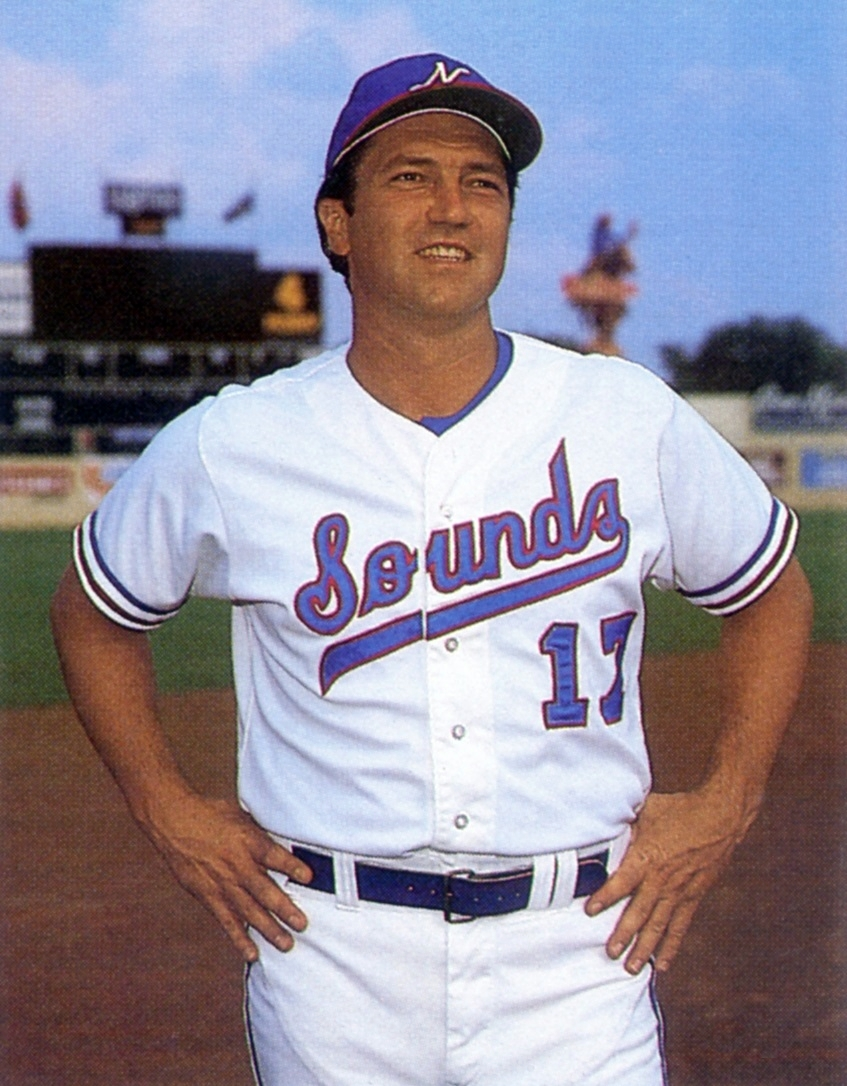
Wayne Garland of the 1982 Southern League champion Sounds returned to coach pitchers from 1987 to 1988.

These personnel have served as pitching coaches, a role instituted in 1980.

Pitching coaches
No.	Coach	Season(s)	Wins	Losses	W%	ERA	SO	Ref(s).	Stat ref(s).
—	None	1978–1979	147	138	.516	3.32	1,630		
1	Pat Dobson	1980–1981	178	108	.622	3.18	1,804		
2	Hoyt Wilhelm	1982–1984	239	198	.547	3.73	2,357		
3	Roger Craig (Note: The 1985 Sounds were not assigned a pitching coach, but Roger Craig, the Detroit Tigers' minor league pitching instructor, made several visits to Nashville to work with pitchers.)	1985	71	70	.504	3.84	783		
4	John Hiller (Note: The 1986 Sounds were not assigned a pitching coach, but John Hiller, the Detroit Tigers' minor league pitching instructor, made several visits to Nashville to work with pitchers.)	1986	68	74	.479	4.25	755		
5	Wayne Garland	1987–1988	137	145	.486	3.89	1,833		
6	Ray Rippelmeyer	1989–1990	160	133	.546	3.52	1,784		
7	Don Gullett	1991	65	78	.455	3.77	886		
8	Frank Funk	1992	67	77	.465	3.82	1,033		
9	Rick Peterson (Note: Rick Peterson was promoted to bullpen coach for the Chicago White Sox on June 21, 1994.)	1993–1994	164	123	.571	3.70	1,951		
10	Kirk Champion (Note: Kirk Champion, pitching coach of the Chicago White Sox' Double-A Birmingham Barons, and Don Cooper, Chicago's minor league pitching coordinator, filled in on a rotating basis from June 21 to July 14, 1994.)	1994	83	61	.576	3.53	1,041		
11	Don Cooper	1994	83	61	.576	3.53	1,041		
12	Dewey Robinson (Note: Dewey Robinson, the Chicago White Sox' former bullpen coach, was assigned to Nashville on July 15, 1994.)	1994	83	61	.576	3.53	1,041		
—	Don Cooper (Note: Don Cooper was promoted to pitching coach for the Chicago White Sox on June 2, 1995.)	1995	68	76	.472	4.04	931		
13	Steve Wilson (Note: Steve Wilson, a Nashville relief pitcher, retired during the 1995 season and was hired as pitching coach.)	1995	68	76	.472	4.04	931		
—	Don Cooper	1996	77	67	.535	3.77	880		
—	Kirk Champion	1997	74	69	.517	4.64	881		
14	Bruce Tanner	1998–1999	147	136	.519	4.73	1,894		
15	Jim Bibby	2000	63	79	.444	4.80	854		
16	Darold Knowles	2001–2004	280	289	.492	4.32	3,961		
17	Stan Kyles^{†}	2005–2008	299	273	.523	4.13	4,327		
18	Chris Bosio (Note: Chris Bosio was promoted to pitching coach for the Milwaukee Brewers on August 12, 2009.)	2009	75	69	.521	4.25	882		
19	Jim Rooney (Note: Jim Rooney, a Milwaukee Brewers roving crosschecker, was assigned to Nashville on August 12, 2009.)	2009	75	69	.521	4.25	882		
20	Rich Gale^{†} (Note: Rich Gale took a temporary leave of absence in the middle of the 2010 season.)	2010	77	67	.535	4.27	938		
21	Bill Castro (Note: Bill Castro, the Milwaukee Brewers' Latin American pitching adviser, replaced Rich Gale during his 2010 leave of absence.)	2010	77	67	.535	4.27	938		
—	Rich Gale^{†} (Note: Rich Gale resigned in June 2011.)	2011	71	73	.493	4.27	1,003		
—	Bill Castro (Note: Bill Castro served in an interim capacity following Rich Gale's June 2011 resignation.)	2011	71	73	.493	4.27	1,003		
—	Chris Bosio (Note: Chris Bosio, a Milwaukee Brewers major league advance scout, was assigned to Nashville in June 2011.)	2011	71	73	.493	4.27	1,003		
22	Fred Dabney	2012–2014	201	231	.465	4.22	3,353		
23	Don Schulze	2015	66	78	.458	3.95	1,037		
24	Rick Rodriguez^{†}	2016–2018	223	198	.530	3.92	3,279		
25	Brian Shouse	2019	66	72	.478	5.48	1,158		
—	Brendan Sagara (Note: Brendan Sagara was hired to serve as pitching coach in 2020, but the season was cancelled due to the COVID-19 pandemic before it began.)	2020	—	—	—	—	—		—
26	Jim Henderson	2021	65	56	.529	4.16	1,108		
27	Jeremy Accardo (Note: Jeremy Accardo left to become the pitching coach for the Arizona State Sun Devils on June 27, 2024.)	2022–2024	252	191	.569	4.30	4,216		
28	Patrick McGuff (Note: Patrick McGuff, Nashville's bullpen coach, became the acting pitching coach on June 27, 2024.)	2024	78	68	.534	4.40	1,286		
29	Bryan Leslie	2025–present	165	132	.556	4.13	2,597		
30	Justin Meccage	2025	85	63	.574	3.91	1,277		
31	Tyler Thornburg	2026–present	80	69	.537	4.36	1,320		

=== Hitting ===
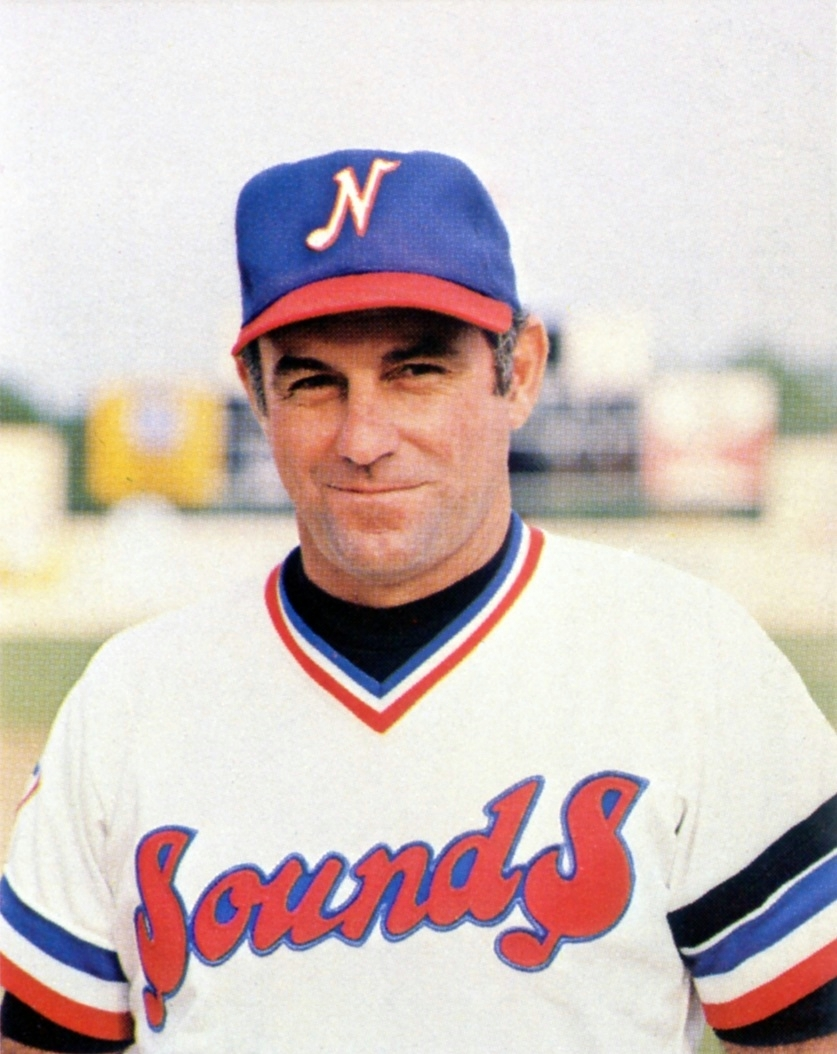
Ed Napoleon was the Sounds' first hitting coach, serving from 1980 to 1982.

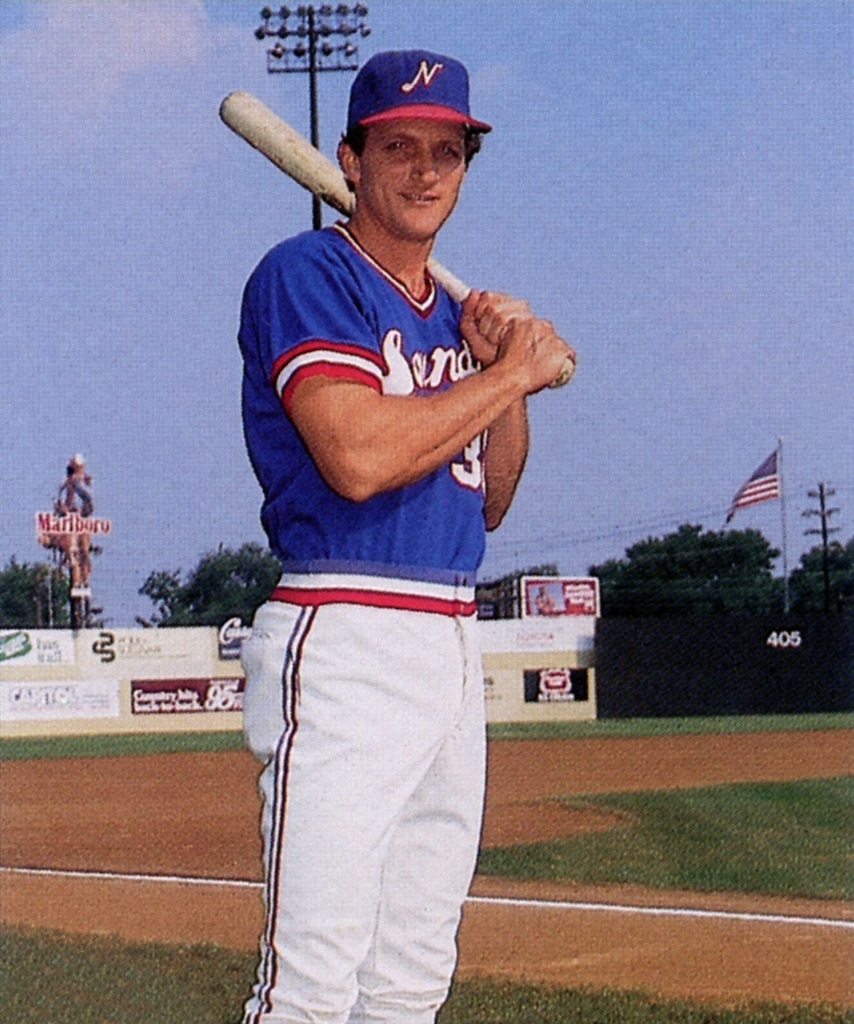
Outfielder Gene Roof served as a player-coach in 1986.

These personnel have served as hitting coaches, a role instituted in 1980 and not utilized in 1985 or from 1988 to 1990.

Hitting coaches
No.	Coach	Season(s)	BA	HR	RBI	Ref(s).	Stat ref(s).
—	None	1978–1979	.256	108	977		
1	Ed Napoleon	1980–1982	.270	273	1,922		
2	Dick Sisler (Note: Dick Sisler was replaced by Jim Saul during the 1983 season.)	1983	.272	100	650		
3	Jim Saul	1983–1984	.268	199	1,244		
—	None	1985	.252	96	521		
4	Gene Roof^{*}	1986	.274	85	600		
5	Jim Lett (Note: Jim Lett was promoted to bench coach for the Cincinnati Reds on March 30, 1987.)	1987	.257	75	535		
6	Buddy Pryor^{*} (Note: Buddy Pryor was named player-coach following Jim Lett's promotion to the Cincinnati Reds.)	1987	.257	75	535		
—	None	1988–1990	.253	246	1,594		
—	Jim Lett	1991–1992	.255	199	1,086		
7	Roger LaFrancois	1993–1996	.264	527	2,482		
8	Von Joshua	1997	.269	153	659		
9	Richie Hebner (Note: Richie Hebner was promoted to manager of the Sounds after Trent Jewett became the Pittsburgh Pirates' third base coach on June 6, 2000.)	1998–2000	.273	482	2,049		
10	Dave Clark (Note: Dave Clark, a Pittsburgh Pirates extended spring training instructor, was assigned to Nashville on June 6, 2000.)	2000	.258	138	639		
11	Jeff Livesey	2001	.276	130	616		
12	Curtis Wilkerson	2002	.262	110	608		
13	Jay Loviglio	2003	.266	116	585		
—	Jeff Livesey	2004	.272	180	642		
14	Gary Pettis	2005–2006	.269	272	1,279		
15	Harry Spilman	2007–2008	.267	278	1,267		
16	Sandy Guerrero	2009–2011	.276	394	1,978		
17	Al LeBoeuf	2012	.259	119	507		
18	Bob Skube^{†}	2013–2014	.260	249	1,145		
19	Webster Garrison	2015	.265	84	548		
20	Eric Martins	2016–2018	.261	408	1,864		
21	Howard Johnson	2019	.261	179	658		
—	Chase Lambin (Note: Chase Lambin was hired to serve as hitting coach in 2020, but the season was cancelled due to the COVID-19 pandemic before it began.)	2020	—	—	—		—
—	Al LeBoeuf	2021–2024	.254	621	2,778		
22	Eric Theisen	2024	.244	133	688		
23	Tim Doherty	2025–present	.246	279	1,375		
24	Zack Jones	2025–present	.246	279	1,375		

=== Bench coaches ===
These personnel have served as bench coaches, a role instituted in 2019 and not utilized from 2020 to 2023.

Bench coaches
No.	Coach	Season(s)	Ref.
1	Geno Petralli	2019	
2	David Tufo	2024–present	

=== Bullpen ===
These personnel served as bullpen coaches, a role utilized only in 2019 and from 2023 to 2024.

Bullpen coaches
No.	Coach	Season(s)	Ref.
1	Éric Gagné	2019	
2	Patrick McGuff	2023–2024	

=== General ===
These personnel have served as general coaches, overseeing various player development roles since 2020.

General coaches
No.	Coach	Season(s)	Ref.
—	Tyler Graham (Note: Tyler Graham was hired as a coach for 2020, but the season was cancelled due to the COVID-19 pandemic before it began.)	2020	
1	Ned Yost IV	2021–2024	
2	Liu Rodríguez	2023	
3	Eric Bunnell	2025–present	

=== Former roles ===
These personnel served in discontinued coaching roles.

Former roles
Coach	Season(s)	Role	Ref.
Sean Isaac	2022	Development coach	

== See also ==
- List of Nashville Sounds managers

== Notes ==
Pitching

Hitting

Other
