= List of Nashville Sounds managers =

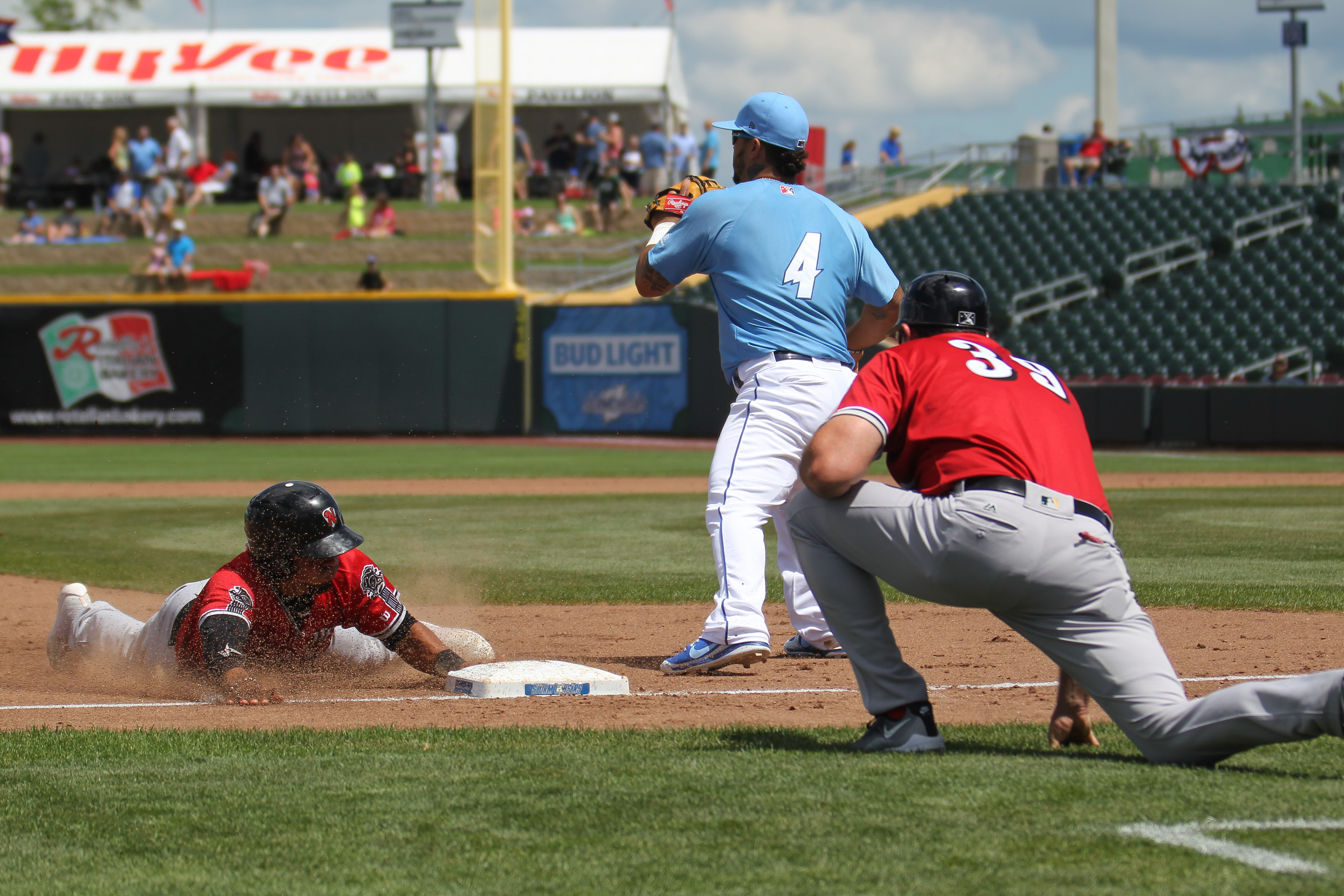
Manager Fran Riordan looks on as Melvin Mercedes slides into third base.

The Nashville Sounds Minor League Baseball team has played in Nashville, Tennessee, since being established in 1978 as an expansion team of the Double-A Southern League. They moved up to Triple-A in 1985 as members of the American Association, joined the Pacific Coast League in 1998, and were placed in the Triple-A East in 2021 before it was renamed the International League in 2022. The team has been led by 29 managers throughout its history. Managers are responsible for team strategy and leadership on and off the field, including determining the batting order, arranging defensive positioning, and making tactical decisions regarding pitching changes, pinch-hitting, pinch-running, and defensive replacements. Rick Sweet has been the Sounds' manager since 2021.

As of the completion of the 2026 season, Nashville's managers have led the club for 6,874 regular-season games in which they have compiled a win–loss record of 3,570–3,302–2 (.519). In 15 postseason appearances, their teams have a record of 42–42 (.500) and have won two Southern League championships and one Pacific Coast League championship. Combining all 6,958 regular-season and postseason games, the Sounds have an all-time record of 3,612–3,344–2 (.519).

Five managers have been selected as their league's Manager of the Year. Stump Merrill (1980) won the Southern League Manager of the Year Award, Rick Renick (1993 and 1996) won the American Association Manager of the Year Award, Frank Kremblas (2007) and Steve Scarsone (2016) won the Pacific Coast League Manager of the Year Award, and Rick Sweet (2022) won the International League Manager of the Year Award. Two have been given the Mike Coolbaugh Award in recognition for their contributions in developing and mentoring minor league players: Mike Guerrero (2013) and Rick Sweet (2022). Three managers were selected for midseason All-Star teams. George Scherger coached the 1979 Southern League All-Star team, and two others participated in the Triple-A All-Star Game: Pete Mackanin as a coach on the National League team in 1991 and Rick Renick as manager of the American League team in 1994.

Rick Sweet has won 564 games over seven seasons (2014, 2021–2026), placing him first on the all-time wins list for Sounds managers. Having managed the team for 1,012 games, he is also the longest-tenured manager in team history. The manager with the highest winning percentage over a full season or more is Stump Merrill (1980–1981), with .622. Conversely, the lowest winning percentage over a season or more is .437 by manager Mike Guerrero (2012–2013).

== History ==
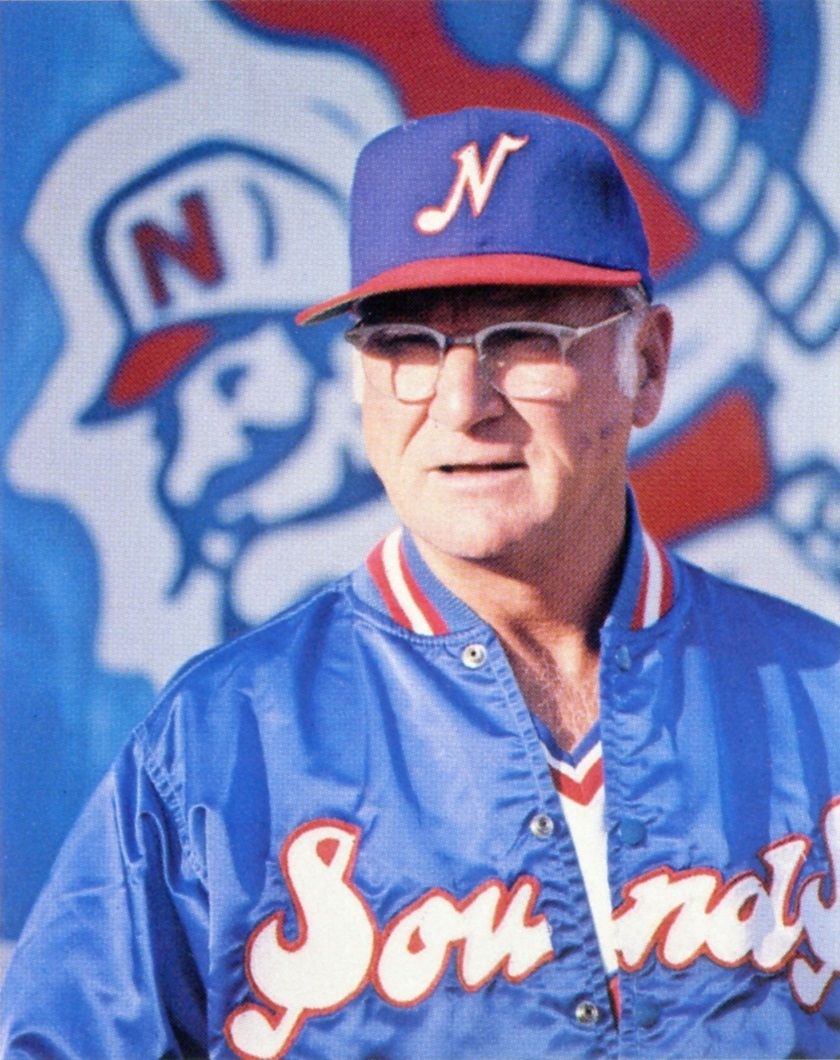
George Scherger led the Sounds to win Southern League championship in 1979.

Playing in the Southern League as the Double-A affiliate of the Cincinnati Reds, the Nashville Sounds were managed by Chuck Goggin in their inaugural 1978 season. Goggin had managed the Reds' previous Double-A team, the Trois-Rivières Aigles, in 1977. He was replaced in 1979 by George Scherger, a veteran manager of 18 minor league seasons. He was chosen as a coach for the 1979 Southern League All-Star team and led Nashville to win their first Southern League championship that year.

The Sounds became the Double-A affiliate of the New York Yankees in 1980. Stump Merrill, who had been with New York's Double-A West Haven Yankees the previous two seasons, led Nashville in the first two years of the new partnership. He was selected for the Southern League Manager of the Year Award in 1980 after the Sounds set a franchise-best 97–46 win–loss record. Merrill's .622 winning percentage from 1980 to 1981 is the highest among all Sounds managers over a full season or more. First-year manager Johnny Oates took over in 1982 and led the club to its second Southern League championship. Doug Holmquist was promoted to Nashville from the Yankees' Class A Greensboro Hornets in 1983. He was succeeded in 1984 by former Major League Baseball (MLB) manager and 1952 Nashville Vol Jim Marshall.

The Sounds moved up to the Triple-A classification in 1985 as members of the American Association, and they affiliated the Detroit Tigers. Lee Walls was assigned to manage the team, but he was hospitalized with internal bleeding after seven games. Outfielder Leon Roberts became the acting manager for the next seven games until being replaced by Gordon Mackenzie, who was promoted from the Tigers' Double-A Birmingham Barons. Roberts retired from playing at the end of the season and was hired to manage the 1986 club.

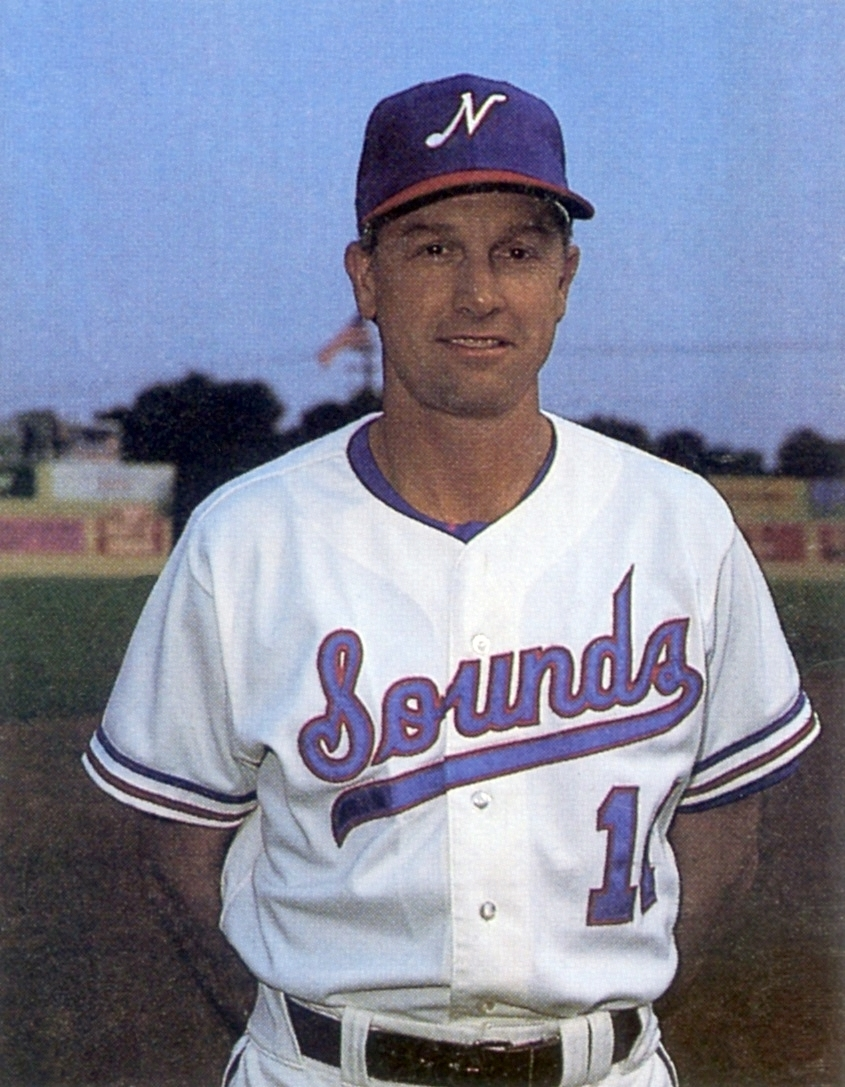
Jack Lind was the first of five managers to lead the team over a five-week period in 1988.

Nashville switched its affiliation back to the Cincinnati Reds in 1987. Jack Lind, previously manager of the Reds' Triple-A Denver Zephyrs, led the team from 1987 through the first three months of the 1988 season. From June to July 1988, the Sounds went through five different managers. Lind was fired on June 27. Pitching coach and former Sounds starting pitcher Wayne Garland served as a fill-in manager for one game. Jim Hoff, Cincinnati's minor league field coordinator, managed the next five games on an interim basis. Former manager George Scherger was brought in on July 3, but he chose to retire after one game. Garland managed two more games before Hoff returned for 17 games. Finally, former big league skipper Frank Lucchesi was hired on July 25 to manage the Sounds for the last 39 games of the season. He remained with the team for the 1989 campaign. Pete Mackanin was hired to lead Nashville in 1990. He was selected to coach the National League team in the 1991 Triple-A All-Star Game. Mackanin was dismissed on June 28, 1992. Dave Miley, manager of Cincinnati's Double-A Chattanooga Lookouts, was promoted to take his place for the rest of the season.

The Sounds became the Triple-A affiliate of the Chicago White Sox in 1993. Rick Renick, who had managed Chicago's Triple-A Vancouver Canadians for two years prior, continued to do so in Nashville from 1993 to 1996. Renick won the American Association Manager of the Year Award in 1993 and 1996, and he was chosen to manage the American League team in the 1994 Triple-A All-Star Game. He was succeeded by White Sox minor league outfield coordinator Tom Spencer in 1997.

Nashville was placed in the Triple-A Pacific Coast League (PCL) in 1998 following the disbandment of the American Association after the 1997 season. As an affiliate of the Pittsburgh Pirates, the Sounds were led by Trent Jewett, who had spent the last two seasons with their former Triple-A club, the Calgary Cannons. He remained in that role until being named Pittsburgh's third base coach on June 6, 2000. Pitching coach Richie Hebner was made manager for the rest of the season. Marty Brown, a former Sounds third baseman from 1988 to 1989, was manager in 2001 and 2002 after two years of leading Pittsburgh's Double-A Altoona Curve. Jewett returned to manage Nashville from 2003 to 2004.

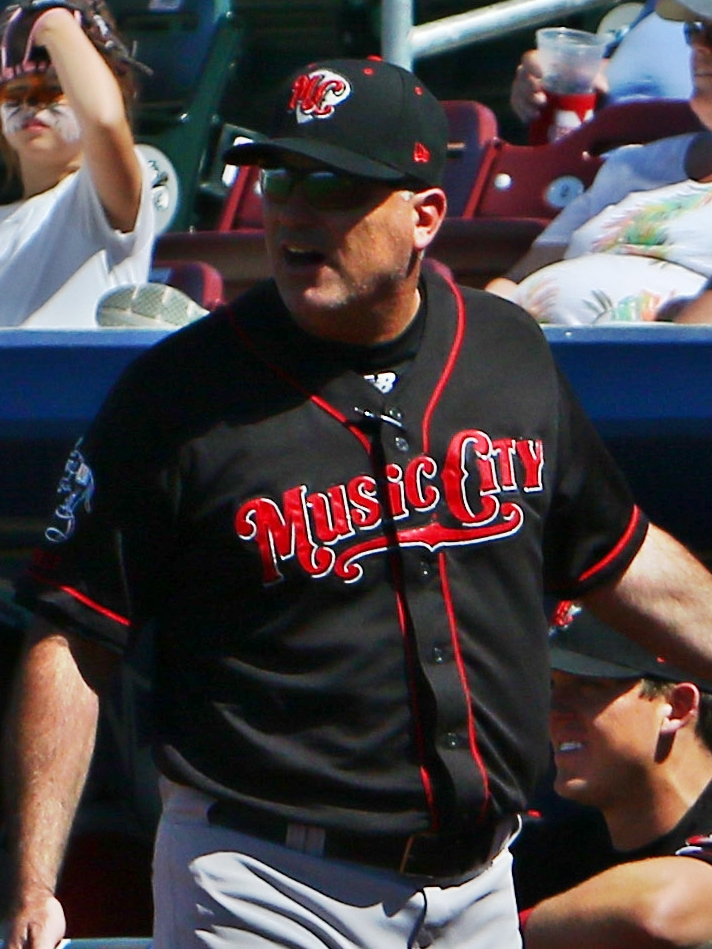
Steve Scarsone won the PCL Manager of the Year Award in 2016.

The Sounds became the Triple-A affiliate of the Milwaukee Brewers in 2005. Frank Kremblas was given the helm at Nashville after managing Milwaukee's Double-A Huntsville Stars for three years. He led the Sounds to win the Pacific Coast League championship in the first season of the affiliation. Kremblas was chosen as the PCL Manager of the Year in 2007 and remained with the club through 2008. Four-time MLB All-Star Don Money, who had replaced Kremblas in Huntsville in 2005, led the Sounds from 2009 to 2011. Mike Guerrero was promoted to Nashville in 2012 after two years at Huntsville. He missed nine games of the 2013 season on bereavement leave. Charlie Greene, the Brewers' field coordinator and catching instructor, served as interim manager during that time. Guerrero returned to finish out the year, after which he won the Mike Coolbaugh Award in recognition for his contributions in developing and mentoring young players in the Brewers organization. His .437 winning percentage is the lowest among all Sounds managers over a full season or more. Rick Sweet, a roving catching instructor for Cincinnati and veteran manager of 24 minor league seasons, led the team in 2014.

Nashville switched its affiliation to the Oakland Athletics in 2015. Steve Scarsone managed the Sounds in 2015 and 2016 after two seasons in the same capacity with the Athletics' former Triple-A club, the Sacramento River Cats. He won the PCL Manager of the Year Award in 2016. Scarsone was succeed in 2017 by Ryan Christenson, who had spent the two previous seasons with Oakland's Double-A Midland RockHounds. Fran Riordan was promoted from Midland to Nashville for 2018.

The Sounds affiliated with the Texas Rangers in 2019. Jason Wood, who had been with the Rangers' Triple-A Round Rock Express for the last four seasons, continued in the same role with Nashville. Wood had also played for the Sounds from 2000 to 2001 at third base and shortstop. First-year manager Darwin Barney was hired to manage in 2020, but the season was cancelled due to the COVID-19 pandemic before it began.

In conjunction with Major League Baseball's restructuring of Minor League Baseball in 2021, the Sounds reaffiliated with the Milwaukee Brewers and were placed in the new Triple-A East. Rick Sweet, who led the team in the final season of their previous term with Milwaukee, continued to manage the Brewers' Triple-A clubs in the six years between affiliations and returned to lead Nashville in 2021. In 2022, the Triple-A East became known as the International League. Sweet won the 2022 International League Manager of the Year Award and the 2022 Mike Coolbaugh Award. Over seven seasons (2014, 2021–2026), Sweet has won 564 games, placing him first on the all-time wins list for Sounds managers. Having managed the team for 1,012 games, he is also the longest-tenured manager in team history.

== Managers ==
Key
No.	A running total of the number of Sounds managers. Any manager who has two or more separate terms is only counted once.
G	Games managed
W	Wins
L	Losses
T	Ties
Apps.	Postseason appearances: number of seasons this manager led the team to the postseason
†	Award winner or All-Star while managing the Sounds

Managers
No.	Manager	Season(s)	Regular-season					Postseason				Composite					Ref(s).
No.	Manager	Season(s)	G	W	L	T	Win %	Apps.	W	L	Win %	G	W	L	T	Win %	Ref(s).
1	Chuck Goggin	1978	141	64	77	—	.454	—	—	—	—	141	64	77	—	.454	
2	George Scherger^{†}	1979	144	83	61	—	.576	1	5	2	.714	151	88	63	—	.583	
3	Stump Merrill^{†}	1980–1981	286	178	108	—	.622	2	5	6	.455	297	183	114	—	.616	
4	Johnny Oates	1982	144	77	67	—	.535	1	6	2	.750	152	83	69	—	.546	
5	Doug Holmquist	1983	146	88	58	—	.603	1	2	3	.400	151	90	61	—	.596	
6	Jim Marshall	1984	147	74	73	—	.503	1	1	3	.250	151	75	76	—	.497	
7	Lee Walls	1985	7	3	4	—	.429	—	—	—	—	7	3	4	—	.429	
8	Leon Roberts	1985	7	2	5	—	.286	—	—	—	—	7	2	5	—	.286	
9	Gordon Mackenzie	1985	127	66	61	1	.520	—	—	—	—	127	66	61	1	.520	
—	Leon Roberts	1986	142	68	74	1	.479	—	—	—	—	142	68	74	1	.479	
10	Jack Lind	1987–1988	217	102	115	—	.470	—	—	—	—	217	102	115	—	.470	
11	Wayne Garland	1988	1	1	0	—	1.000	—	—	—	—	1	1	0	—	1.000	
12	Jim Hoff	1988	5	4	1	—	.800	—	—	—	—	5	4	1	—	.800	
—	George Scherger	1988	1	0	1	—	.000	—	—	—	—	1	0	1	—	.000	
—	Wayne Garland	1988	2	0	2	—	.000	—	—	—	—	2	0	2	—	.000	
—	Jim Hoff	1988	17	8	9	—	.471	—	—	—	—	17	8	9	—	.471	
13	Frank Lucchesi	1988–1989	185	96	89	—	.519	—	—	—	—	185	96	89	—	.519	
14	Pete Mackanin^{†} (Note: Pete Mackanin was dismissed on June 28, 1992.)	1990–1992	366	186	180	—	.508	1	2	3	.400	371	188	183	—	.507	
15	Dave Miley (Note: Dave Miley, manager of Cincinnati's Double-A Chattanooga Lookouts, was promoted to manager of the Sounds on June 28, 1992.)	1992	68	32	36	—	.471	—	—	—	—	68	32	36	—	.471	
16	Rick Renick^{†}	1993–1996	575	309	266	—	.537	2	7	7	.500	589	316	273	—	.537	
17	Tom Spencer	1997	143	74	69	—	.517	—	—	—	—	143	74	69	—	.517	
18	Trent Jewett (Note: Trent Jewett became Pittsburgh's third base coach on June 6, 2000.)	1998–2000	340	176	164	—	.518	—	—	—	—	340	176	164	—	.518	
19	Richie Hebner (Note: Richie Hebner, Nashville's pitching coach, was promoted to manager on June 6, 2000.)	2000	85	34	51	—	.400	—	—	—	—	85	34	51	—	.400	
20	Marty Brown	2001–2002	284	136	148	—	.479	—	—	—	—	284	136	148	—	.479	
—	Trent Jewett	2003–2004	285	144	141	—	.505	1	3	4	.429	292	147	145	—	.503	
21	Frank Kremblas^{†}	2005–2008	572	299	273	—	.523	3	9	8	.529	589	308	281	—	.523	
22	Don Money	2009–2011	432	223	209	—	.516	—	—	—	—	432	223	209	—	.516	
23	Mike Guerrero^{†} (Note: Mike Guerrero missed nine games of the 2013 season on bereavement leave.)	2012–2013	279	122	157	—	.437	—	—	—	—	279	122	157	—	.437	
24	Charlie Greene (Note: Charlie Greene, Milwaukee's field coordinator and catching instructor, served as interim manager for nine games in May 2013 while manager Mike Guerrero was on bereavement leave.)	2013	9	2	7	—	.222	—	—	—	—	9	2	7	—	.222	
25	Rick Sweet	2014	144	77	67	—	.535	—	—	—	—	144	77	67	—	.535	
26	Steve Scarsone^{†}	2015–2016	286	149	137	—	.521	1	2	3	.400	291	151	140	—	.519	
27	Ryan Christenson	2017	139	68	71	—	.489	—	—	—	—	139	68	71	—	.489	
28	Fran Riordan	2018	140	72	68	—	.514	—	—	—	—	140	72	68	—	.514	
29	Jason Wood	2019	138	66	72	—	.478	—	—	—	—	138	66	72	—	.478	
—	Darwin Barney (Note: Darwin Barney was hired to manage the 2020 team, but the season was cancelled due to the COVID-19 pandemic before it began.)	2020	Season cancelled (COVID-19 pandemic)														
—	Rick Sweet^{†}	2021–2026	868	487	381	—	.561	1	0	1	.000	869	487	382	—	.560	
Totals	29 managers	49 seasons	6,874	3,570	3,302	2	.519	15	42	42	.500	6,958	3,612	3,344	2	.519	—

Managers with multiple tenures
No.	Manager	Season(s)	Regular-season					Postseason				Composite					Ref(s).
No.	Manager	Season(s)	G	W	L	T	Win %	Apps.	W	L	Win %	G	W	L	T	Win %	Ref(s).
2	George Scherger^{†}	1979, 1988	145	83	62	—	.572	1	5	2	.714	152	88	64	—	.579	
8	Leon Roberts	1985, 1986	149	70	79	1	.470	—	—	—	—	149	70	79	1	.470	
11	Wayne Garland (Note: Wayne Garland served as an interim manager for two periods in 1988.)	1988	3	1	2	—	.333	—	—	—	—	3	1	2	—	.333	
12	Jim Hoff (Note: Jim Hoff served as an interim manager for two periods in 1988.)	1988	22	12	10	—	.545	—	—	—	—	22	12	10	—	.545	
18	Trent Jewett	1998–2000, 2003–2004	625	320	305	—	.512	1	3	4	.429	632	323	309	—	.511	
25	Rick Sweet^{†}	2014, 2021–2026	1,012	564	448	—	.557	1	0	1	.000	1,013	564	449	—	.557	

== See also ==
- List of Nashville Sounds coaches
