= Randy Knorr =

American baseball player and coach (born 1968)

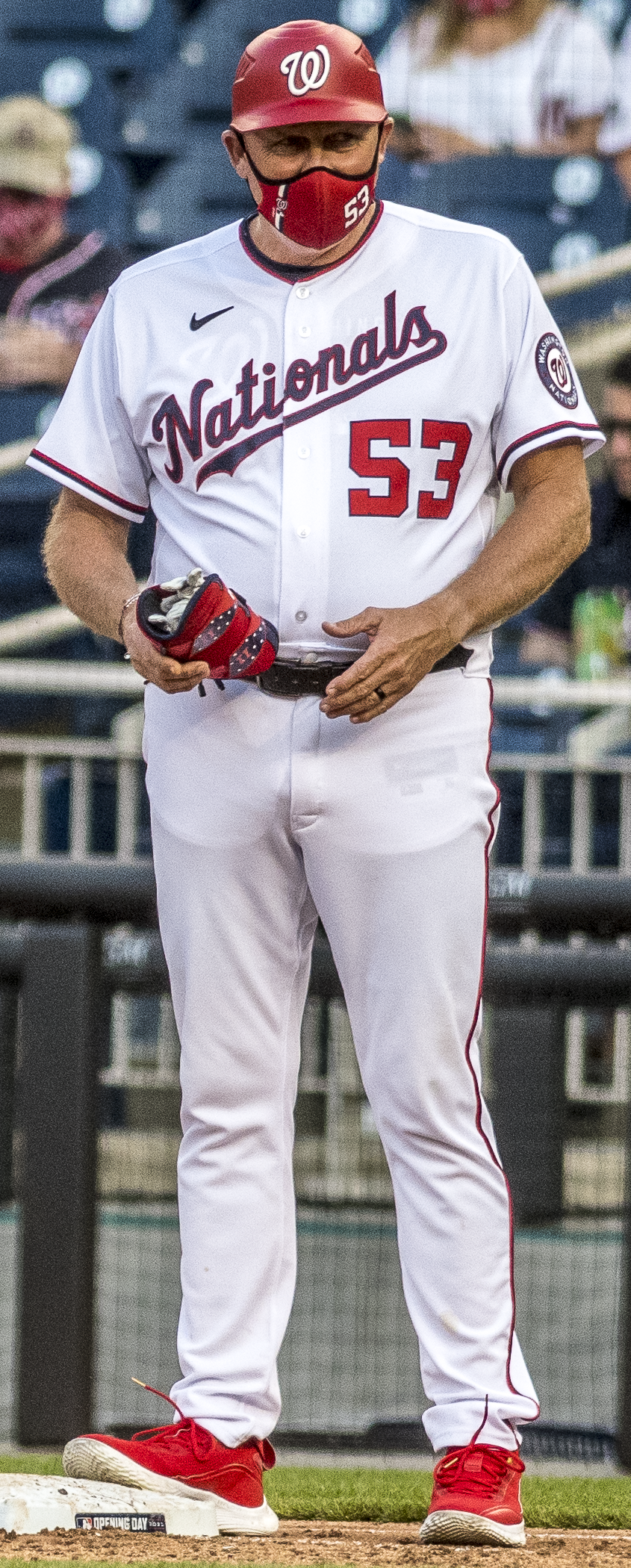
- Knorr with the Nationals in 2021

San Diego Padres – No. 49
- Catcher / Coach
- Born: November 12, 1968 (age 58); San Gabriel, California, U.S.
- Batted: Right Threw: Right

MLB debut
- September 5, 1991, for the Toronto Blue Jays

Last MLB appearance
- September 9, 2001, for the Montreal Expos

MLB statistics
- Batting average: .226
- Home runs: 24
- Runs batted in: 88
- Stats at Baseball Reference

Teams
- As player: Toronto Blue Jays (1991–1995); Houston Astros (1996–1997); Florida Marlins (1998); Houston Astros (1999); Texas Rangers (2000); Montreal Expos (2001); As coach: Washington Nationals (2006, 2009–2015, 2021); San Diego Padres (2026–present)

Career highlights and awards
- World Series champion (1993)

Randy Duane Knorr (born November 12, 1968) is an American professional baseball player, coach, and manager. He currently serves as the bench coach for the San Diego Padres of Major League Baseball (MLB). Knorr is a former catcher in MLB who played for the Toronto Blue Jays (1991–1995), Houston Astros (1996–1997 and 1999), Florida Marlins (1998), Texas Rangers (2000), and Montreal Expos (2001).

== Playing career ==
Knorr was on the Toronto Blue Jays during their 1991 American League Eastern Division and 1992 and 1993 World Series wins. He also helped the Astros win the 1997 and 1999 National League Central Division. During the Australian summer of 1989–90, Knorr played ball for the Melbourne Monarchs and the Williamstown Wolves.

In 11 seasons, Knorr played in 253 games and compiled a .226 batting average with 24 home runs and 88 RBI. Shortly before he retired, he played for the Edmonton Trappers. In July 2004, Knorr became a citizen of Canada. He played with the Cardenales de Lara in the Venezuelan winter league in the 1990–91 season being champions for the first time in the Venezuelan league.

== Coaching career ==
=== Washington Nationals ===
In 2008, Knorr was the manager of the Potomac Nationals, who he guided to the 2008 Carolina League Mills Cup championship on September 12, 2008. He served as the bullpen coach for the Washington Nationals for the last half of the 2006 season and was hired to be the bullpen coach for a second time in 2009. He was promoted to bench coach in 2012, and served in that capacity under Davey Johnson and then Matt Williams, for 4 years. Shortly after the 2015 season, Williams was fired as the manager, and Knorr was told that his contract would not be renewed; soon afterwards, Knorr returned to the Nationals organization as Senior Advisor to the General Manager for Player Development.

On October 23, 2017, Randy was named the manager of the Syracuse Chiefs, the Washington Nationals Triple-A affiliate. He previously managed the Chiefs in 2011.

On October 28, 2020, he was named first base coach for the Washington Nationals. On October 10, 2021, Knorr was removed from his position and assigned to a player development role. His contract was not renewed by the Nationals on October 9, 2025.

=== San Diego Padres ===
On November 24, 2025, the San Diego Padres hired Knorr to serve as the team's bench coach under new manager Craig Stammen.

Sporting positions
Preceded by Bob Henley	Potomac Nationals Manager; 2006	Succeeded by Edgar Caceres
Preceded by John Wetteland	Washington Nationals Bullpen Coach; 2006	Succeeded by Ricardo Aponte
Preceded by Edgar Caceres	Potomac Nationals Manager; 2007-2008	Succeeded by Trent Jewett
Preceded by Ricardo Aponte	Washington Nationals Bullpen Coach; 2009	Succeeded by Jim Lett
Preceded by John Stearns	Harrisburg Senators Manager; 2010-2010	Succeeded by Tony Beasley
Preceded by Trent Jewett	Syracuse Chiefs Manager; 2011	Succeeded by Tony Beasley
Preceded by Pat Corrales	Washington Nationals Bench Coach; 2012–2015	Succeeded by Chris Speier
Preceded by Billy Gardner Jr.	Syracuse Chiefs Manager; 2018	Succeeded by Tony DeFrancesco
Preceded by Bob Henley	Washington Nationals First Base Coach; 2020-2022	Succeeded by Eric Young Jr
