= Bob Henley =

American baseball player and coach (born 1973)

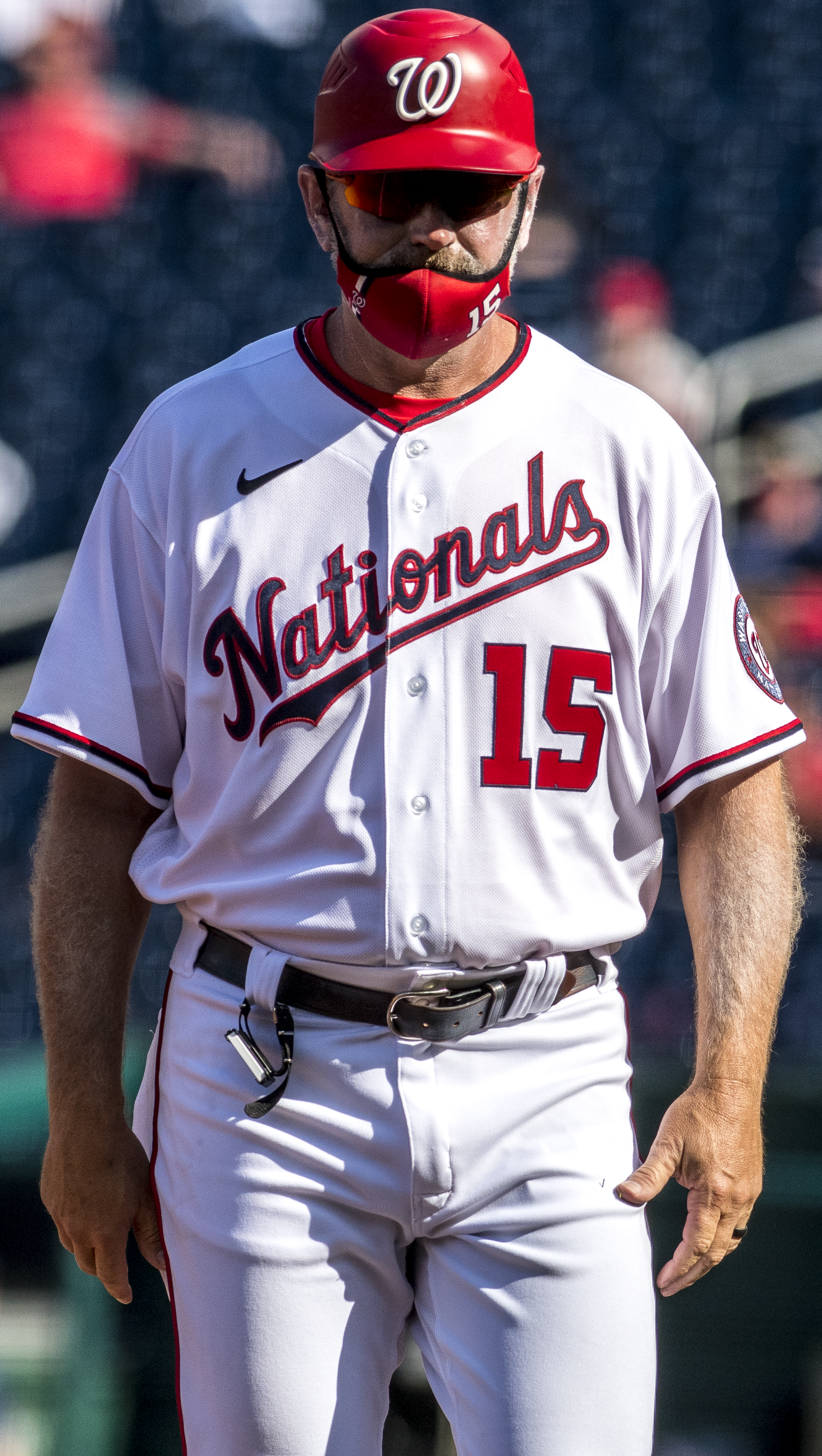
- Henley with the Nationals in 2021

San Diego Padres – No. 20
- Catcher
- Born: January 30, 1973 (age 53); Mobile, Alabama, U.S.
- Batted: Right Threw: Right

MLB debut
- July 19, 1998, for the Montreal Expos

Last MLB appearance
- September 26, 1998, for the Montreal Expos

MLB statistics
- Batting average: .304
- Home runs: 3
- Runs batted in: 18
- Stats at Baseball Reference

Teams
- As player: Montreal Expos (1998); As coach: Washington Nationals (2014–2021, 2025); San Diego Padres (2026–present)

Career highlights and awards
- World Series champion (2019)

Robert Clifton Henley (born January 30, 1973) is an American professional baseball catcher, coach, and manager. He currently serves as the third base coach for the San Diego Padres of Major League Baseball (MLB). A longtime member of the Washington Nationals organization, he was promoted to Major League third-base coach on the staff of new Nationals' manager Matt Williams on November 19, 2013.

== Playing career ==
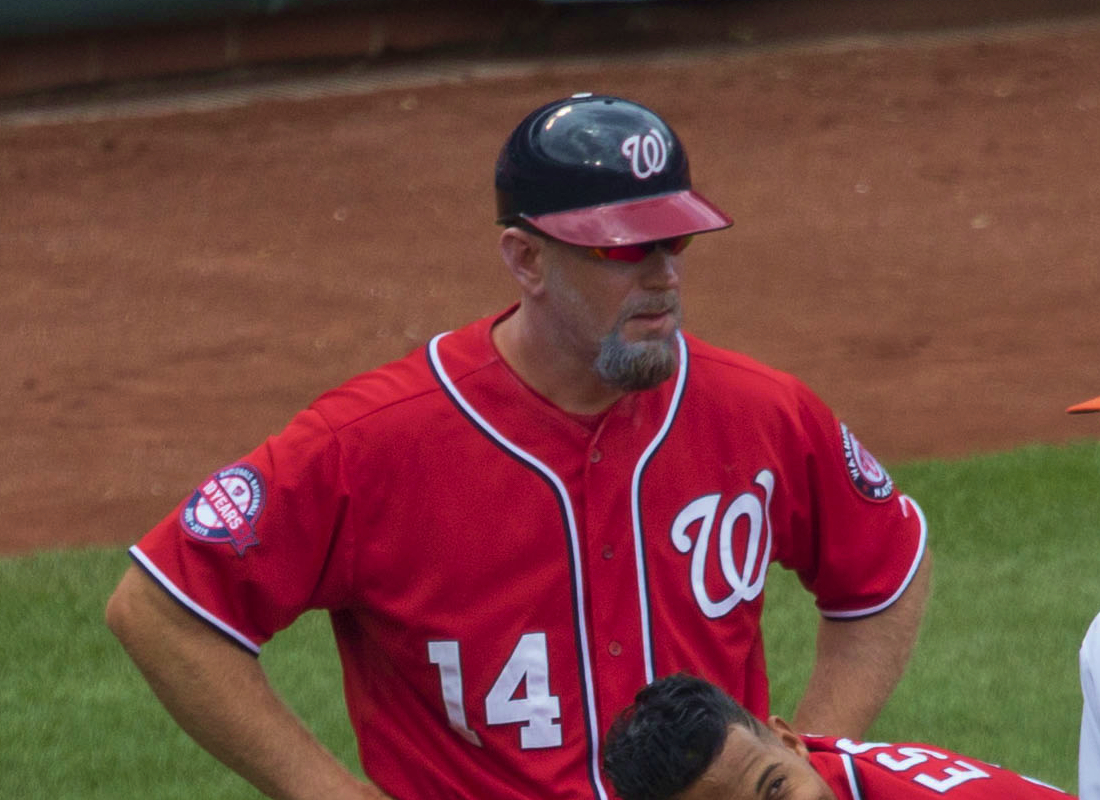
Henley in 2015

During his active career (1993–1999; 2002), Henley threw and batted right-handed; he stood 6 feet 2 inches (1.88 m) tall and weighed 190 pounds (86 kg). He graduated from Mobile County High School in Grand Bay, Alabama, and was selected in the 26th round by the Montreal Expos (predecessors to the Nationals) in the 1991 Major League Baseball draft. Fighting persistent injuries, Henley broke into pro baseball in 1993, then progressed through the Montreal farm system, batting over .300 twice.

In 1998, he saw his only Major League service. He spent the early part of the season on the disabled list, and then appeared in 50 minor league games with the Triple-A Ottawa Lynx and the Single-A Jupiter Hammerheads before making his MLB debut as a defensive replacement in the eighth inning of a 6–1 loss to the Pittsburgh Pirates on July 19 at Olympic Stadium. He walked in his first MLB plate appearance, and, the following day, when he started against the Philadelphia Phillies, he singled off Curt Schilling in his first official at bat.

Henley would appear in 41 games, starting 30 at catcher, for the 1998 Expos, as he and Mike Hubbard backed up regular Chris Widger. He amassed 35 hits and 11 walks in 132 plate appearances, batting .304 and collecting three homers (off Pedro Astacio, Kirt Ojala and Bobby Jones) and eight doubles. On September 25, his penultimate appearance of the season, Henley went 4-for-4 with two doubles and three runs batted in against the St. Louis Cardinals.

But 1998 would be his only Major League season, and his last full season as an active player. Beset by elbow miseries, he played in only two minor league games in 1999 and missed the 2000 and 2001 campaigns completely. Released by the Expos, he got into one minor league game with the Single-A Hickory Crawdads, a Pittsburgh Pirates affiliate, in 2002, before retiring as a player.

== Coaching career ==
=== Montreal Expos / Washington Nationals ===
Henley rejoined the Montreal system in 2003 as manager of the rookie-level Gulf Coast League Expos, and remained in the organization after the Expos relocated to Washington, D.C., in 2005, managing at the Rookie and Single-A levels through 2009, and serving as the Nationals' field coordinator of minor league instruction from 2010 to 2013, leading to his promotion to Williams' staff. He was fired with Williams and the rest of the coaching staff after the 2015 season, but was rehired to serve under new manager Dusty Baker. His contract expired after the 2017 season, but Henley was again rehired as third base coach, becoming the only holdover from Baker's coaching staff to join the new staff headed by manager Dave Martinez. On October 10, 2021, Henley was removed from his major league role but remained in the organization in a player development role.

On July 8, 2025, following the firing of Martinez, Henley was re-hired to the Nationals' coaching staff as the team's major league field coordinator.

=== San Diego Padres ===
On December 9, 2025, the San Diego Padres hired Henley to serve as the team's third base coach under new manager Craig Stammen.

On August 17, 2026, with the Padres facing the New York Mets at Citi Field, Henley sent Jake Cronenworth and Manny Machado home from second base on consecutive singles to right field in the first inning. Mets' right fielder Carson Benge made excellent throws home to easily nab both at the plate, and the Padres failed to score despite getting four hits in the inning. After the game, Padres' manager Craig Stammen defended Henley's sends: “Our mentality is to be aggressive on the basepaths, make the other team make a play. Tonight, they made the plays.”

Sporting positions
| Preceded by Andy Skeels | GCL Expos manager 2003 | Succeeded by Arturo DeFreitas |
| Preceded by Joey Cora | Savannah Sand Gnats manager 2004 | Succeeded by Randy Knorr |
| Preceded by Edgar Caceres | Potomac Nationals manager 2005 | Succeeded by Randy Knorr |
| Preceded by Wendell Kim | GCL Nationals manager 2006-2009 | Succeeded by Bobby Williams |
| Preceded by Trent Jewett; Chip Hale | Washington Nationals third base coach 2014–2019; 2021 | Succeeded by Chip Hale; Gary DiSarcina |
| Preceded by Tim Bogar | Washington Nationals first base coach 2020 | Succeeded by Randy Knorr |
