= Charlie Greene (baseball) =

American baseball player (born 1971)

Milwaukee Brewers – No. 88
- Catcher / Coach
- Born: January 23, 1971 (age 55); Miami, Florida, U.S.
- Batted: Right Threw: Right

MLB debut
- September 15, 1996, for the New York Mets

Last MLB appearance
- July 1, 2000, for the Toronto Blue Jays

MLB statistics
- Batting average: .173
- Home runs: 0
- Runs batted in: 2
- Stats at Baseball Reference

Teams
- As player: New York Mets (1996); Baltimore Orioles (1997–1998); Milwaukee Brewers (1999); Toronto Blue Jays (2000); As coach: Milwaukee Brewers (2024–present)

Career highlights and awards
- As coach: World Series champion (2026)
Medals
Men's baseball
Representing United States
Pan American Games
Silver medal – second place	1999 Winnipeg	Team
World Junior Baseball Championship
Gold medal – first place	1989 Trois-Rivières	Team

Charles Patrick Greene (born January 23, 1971) is an American former professional baseball catcher who currently serves as the bullpen coach for the Milwaukee Brewers of Major League Baseball (MLB). Greene played in Major League Baseball (MLB) for the New York Mets, Baltimore Orioles, Brewers, and Toronto Blue Jays from 1996 through 2000.

== Career ==
Greene attended Killian Senior High School in Miami, Florida, from 1986 to 1989. He was drafted in the 11th round of the 1989 MLB draft by the Seattle Mariners as a senior, but decided to play for his father, Dr. Charles P. Greene, who coached at Miami-Dade College from 1968 to 1996. In 1990, Greene played collegiate summer baseball with the Wareham Gatemen of the Cape Cod Baseball League.

Greene entered the MLB in 1996 with the New York Mets, playing for them one year before moving to the Baltimore Orioles (1997–98), Milwaukee Brewers (1999) and Toronto Blue Jays (2000). His most productive season came in 1999 with Milwaukee, when he appeared in a career-high 32 games and hit a .173 batting average. In 55 games, Greene was a .173 hitter (13-for-75) with five runs and two RBI without home runs.

Following his MLB career, Greene has played in Triple-A for the Florida Marlins and Tampa Bay Devil Rays organizations.

Greene currently works as the bullpen coach for the Milwaukee Brewers.

In 2009, Greene served as an interim manager of the Triple-A Nashville Sounds for nine games while manager Mike Guerrero was on bereavement leave following the death of his father.

== Personal life ==
Greene's younger brother Mick played Division I basketball at the University of South Florida. His son Garrett is a wide receiver for the Tampa Bay Buccaneers and was a quarterback for the West Virginia University Mountaineers.
