= Keith Champion =

American baseball executive

Randall Keith Champion (born September 19, 1959, in Granite City, Illinois, United States) is an American baseball executive. Previously, he scouted for Major League Baseball teams and played, coached and managed in the minor leagues.

Prior to playing professionally, Champion attended Missouri State University. From 1982 to 1984, Champion played in the St. Louis Cardinals farm system. He was a catcher.

After his playing career, he was a coach for the Savannah Cardinals in 1985, Springfield Cardinals in 1986 and Arkansas Travelers in 1987. He managed 7 seasons, the Savannah Cardinals from 1988 & 1989, the Springfield Cardinals in 1990, the AZL Cardinals in 1991, San Diego's Waterloo Diamonds in 1992, Rancho Cucamonga Quakes in 1993 and the Wichita Wranglers in 1994.

Champion was an advance scout for the Chicago Cubs from 1995 to 1999 and a Special Assistant to the General Manager from 2000 to 2006. He was then a scout for the Boston Red Sox in 2007 & 2008 and in 2009 to 2011 he served as a Special Assistant to the General Manager of the Pittsburgh Pirates. He is now the advance scout for the San Francisco Giants.

His brother, Kirk Champion is a coach with the Chicago White Sox.
