= Rich Gale =

American baseball player (born 1954)

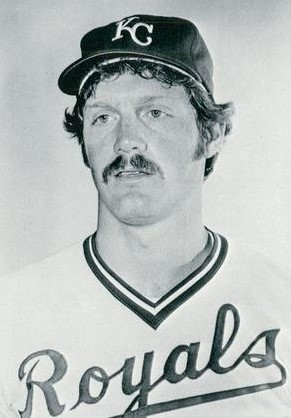
- Pitcher
- Born: January 19, 1954 (age 72); Littleton, New Hampshire, U.S.
- Batted: Right Threw: Right

MLB debut
- April 30, 1978, for the Kansas City Royals

Last MLB appearance
- September 28, 1984, for the Boston Red Sox

MLB statistics
- Win–loss record: 55–56
- Earned run average: 4.54
- Strikeouts: 518

NPB statistics
- Win–loss record: 18–18
- Earned run average: 4.42
- Strikeouts: 228
- Stats at Baseball Reference

Teams
- Kansas City Royals (1978–1981); San Francisco Giants (1982); Cincinnati Reds (1983); Boston Red Sox (1984); Hanshin Tigers (1985–1986)

Richard Blackwell Gale (born January 19, 1954) is an American former starting pitcher in Major League Baseball (MLB) who played with four teams between 1978 and 1984. Listed at 6 ft 7 in (2.01 m) and 225 lb (102 kg), Gale batted and threw right-handed. During 1992 and 1993, he served as pitching coach for the Boston Red Sox. In 2006, he earned honorable mention for the New Hampshire Athlete of the Century.

== Career ==
Born in Littleton, New Hampshire, Gale went to the University of New Hampshire on a basketball scholarship, but made his mark on the baseball diamond. In 1974, he played collegiate summer baseball for the Falmouth Commodores of the Cape Cod Baseball League, and was named a league all-star. Selected by the Kansas City Royals in the 1975 draft, he entered the Majors in 1978 with the Royals, playing for them four years before joining the San Francisco Giants (1982), Cincinnati Reds (1983) and Boston Red Sox (1984).

Gale's most productive season came in his rookie year, when he went 14–8 with 88 strikeouts and a 3.09 ERA, including a 5–0, one-hit shutout against the Texas Rangers at Royals Stadium on June 13, 1978. His no-hitter bid was broken up by Al Oliver with a triple in the fourth inning. Gale finished fourth in the American League Rookie of the Year vote behind Lou Whitaker, Paul Molitor, and Carney Lansford, and over Alan Trammell and received an American League MVP vote, garnering both the TSN Rookie of the Year and 1978 Topps All-Star Rookie Roster honors.

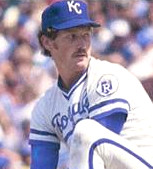
Gale in 1980

In 1979, Gale faded to 9–10, but he resurfaced with a 13–9 mark in 1980, helping his team the reach the 1980 World Series. He started games three and six of the Series, going 0–1 with a 4.25 ERA against the eventual World Champion Philadelphia Phillies. During the next three seasons his playing time was limited by arm injuries and he did not pitch again in a major league game after 1984.

In a seven-season career, Gale posted a 55–56 record with 518 strikeouts and a 4.54 ERA in 195 appearances, including 144 starts, 21 complete games, 5 shutouts, 13 games finished, 2 saves, and 970.0 innings of work. A good-hitting pitcher who occasionally pinch-hit, he collected a .150 batting average (9-for-68) with 2 home runs, 2 doubles, 6 runs, and 5 RBI.

Following his major league career, Gale played in the Japan Central League for the 1985 Hanshin Tigers, who won their first-ever Japan Series with Gale pitching the winning game. He later played with the Fort Myers Sun Sox of the Senior Professional Baseball Association 1989–1990 and for Triple-A Pawtucket 1991.

After his playing career ended, Gale worked as a pitching coach for the Boston Red Sox 1992–1993, Double-A Carolina Mudcats 2006, Triple-A Albuquerque Isotopes 2007–2008, and in the Washington Nationals system 2009. From 2010 through June 2011, he served as pitching coach for the Triple-A Nashville Sounds. Before joining the Sounds in 2010, Gale was a pitching coach for the Carolina Mudcats, Albuquerque Isotopes and the Hagerstown Suns. Gale resigned as a Sounds coach in June 2011, citing personal reasons for his departure.

== Personal life ==
Gale was a witness to the Hyatt Regency walkway collapse on July 17, 1981. He had been working as a bartender at one of the five bars in the hotel's lobby because of the 1981 MLB strike. He called the disaster "the worst thing I've ever seen or imagined."

Preceded by Bill Fischer	Boston Red Sox pitching coach 1992–1993	Succeeded by Mike Roarke
