= Mark Wiley =

American baseball player (born 1948)

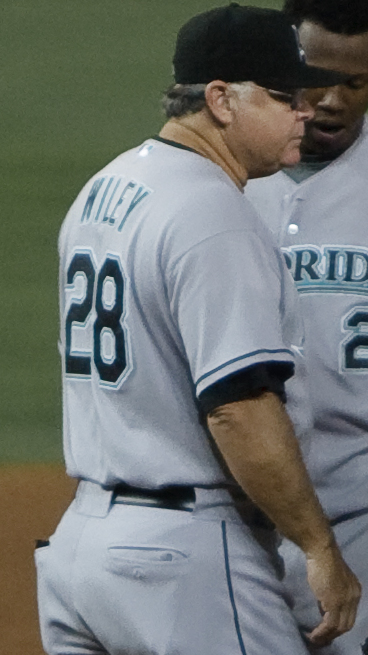
- Wiley with the Florida Marlins in 2009
- Pitcher
- Born: February 28, 1948 (age 78); National City, California, U.S.
- Batted: Right Threw: Right

MLB debut
- June 17, 1975, for the Minnesota Twins

Last MLB appearance
- September 29, 1978, for the Toronto Blue Jays

MLB statistics
- Win–loss record: 2–3
- Earned run average: 6.06
- Strikeouts: 18
- Stats at Baseball Reference

Teams
- Minnesota Twins (1975); San Diego Padres (1978); Toronto Blue Jays (1978)

Mark Eugene Wiley (born February 28, 1948) is an American former Director of Pitching Operations for the Colorado Rockies. Wiley only pitched in parts of two Major League Baseball seasons, however, he remained in the game as a pitching coach and front office executive for over forty years.

== Minnesota Twins ==
Wiley was drafted by the Minnesota Twins in the second round of the 1970 Major League Baseball draft. After four unspectacular seasons in the Twins' farm system, in which he went 49-44 with a 3.98 earned run average, Wiley had a breakthrough season with the Pacific Coast League's Tacoma Twins in 1975. He went 9-1 with a 2.15 ERA to earn a call up to Minnesota that June. Wiley went 2-3 with a 6.05 ERA mostly as a reliever his only season in Minnesota, however, he earned a complete game victory in the second game of a doubleheader with the California Angels for his first major league win.

== San Diego Padres ==
After spending the entire 1976 season with Tacoma, he was cut during Spring training 1977. He signed a minor league deal with the San Diego Padres shortly afterwards, and had a PCL leading sixteen victories for the Hawaii Islanders in 1977.

He earned a call up to the majors in June 1978, and was effective in his first three appearances (1-0, 1.29 ERA, while holding batters to a .185 batting average), until a July 7 outing against the Atlanta Braves. In two thirds of an inning, he allowed four earned runs, and also allowed two inherited runners to score. He returned to Hawaii shortly afterwards.

== Toronto Blue Jays ==
That September, he was traded to the Toronto Blue Jays for minor league outfielder Andrew Dyes. He made two appearances for the Jays, in blowout losses to the New York Yankees and Boston Red Sox.

He spent all of 1979 with the International League's Syracuse Chiefs. During Spring training 1980, he was traded to the California Angels for fellow right handed pitcher Mike Barlow. He was released by the Angels without making an appearance at any level. He caught on with the Baltimore Orioles, and spent the 1980 season with the Rochester Red Wings before retiring, and going into coaching.

== Coaching ==
Wiley's first coaching job was managing the Orioles' Southern League affiliate, the Charlotte O's in 1981. Barely a month into his new job, Wiley was fined & suspended for bumping an umpire. He led the team to a 74-69 record.

He remained a coach in their minor league system until 1987, when he was added to the major league staff under new manager Cal Ripken, Sr. After just one season, in which the Orioles went 67-95 with a 5.01 ERA (second worst in the American League), Wiley resigned. A month later, he became pitching coach of the Cleveland Indians, who had the worst ERA in the AL in 1987.

With Wiley on board, the Indians' staff ERA improved more than one run per game in 1988 (4.16, from 5.28 in 1987). In 1989, it improved to 3.65, fifth best in the American League. After a disastrous 1991 season, in which the Indians lost 105 games, Wiley was replaced as pitching coach by Rick Adair, however, he accepted another position within the organization. From 1992-1994, he served as a special assignment scout.

He was renamed pitching coach in 1995, and held the position until 1998. He was again offered another position in the organization following his dismissal as pitching coach, but declined. Shortly afterwards, he accepted a job as pitching coach with the Kansas City Royals. The Royals finished with a league worst 5.35 ERA, and the fewest strikeouts in the American League on its way to a 64-97 record in 1999. After just one season in Kansas City, Wiley resigned, and accepted a front office position with the Colorado Rockies.

He left the Rockies' front office to become pitching coach for the Florida Marlins on November 9, 2004. He was, however, fired after just one season, in which the Marlins went 83-79 with a 4.16 ERA. He returned to his front office job with the Rockies for two years, until returning to the Marlins' dugout for the 2008 season. He was fired at the end of the 2009 season despite the Marlins finishing twelve games about .500 with the lowest payroll in baseball. He accepted the position of special assistant to Marlins General Manager Mike Hill until returning to the Rockies in 2012. On October 24, 2021, Wiley announced his retirement.

Preceded by Ken Rowe; Sammy Ellis	Baltimore Orioles Pitching Coach; 1987; 2001–2004	Succeeded by Herm Starrette; Ray Miller
Preceded by Jack Aker; Phil Regan	Cleveland Indians Pitching Coach; 1988–1991; 1995–1998	Succeeded by Rick Adair; Phil Regan
Preceded by Bruce Kison	Kansas City Royals Pitching Coach; 1999	Succeeded by Brent Strom
Preceded by Wayne Rosenthal; Rick Kranitz	Florida Marlins Pitching Coach; 2005; 2008–2009	Succeeded by Rick Kranitz; Randy St. Claire
