= Rick Adair =

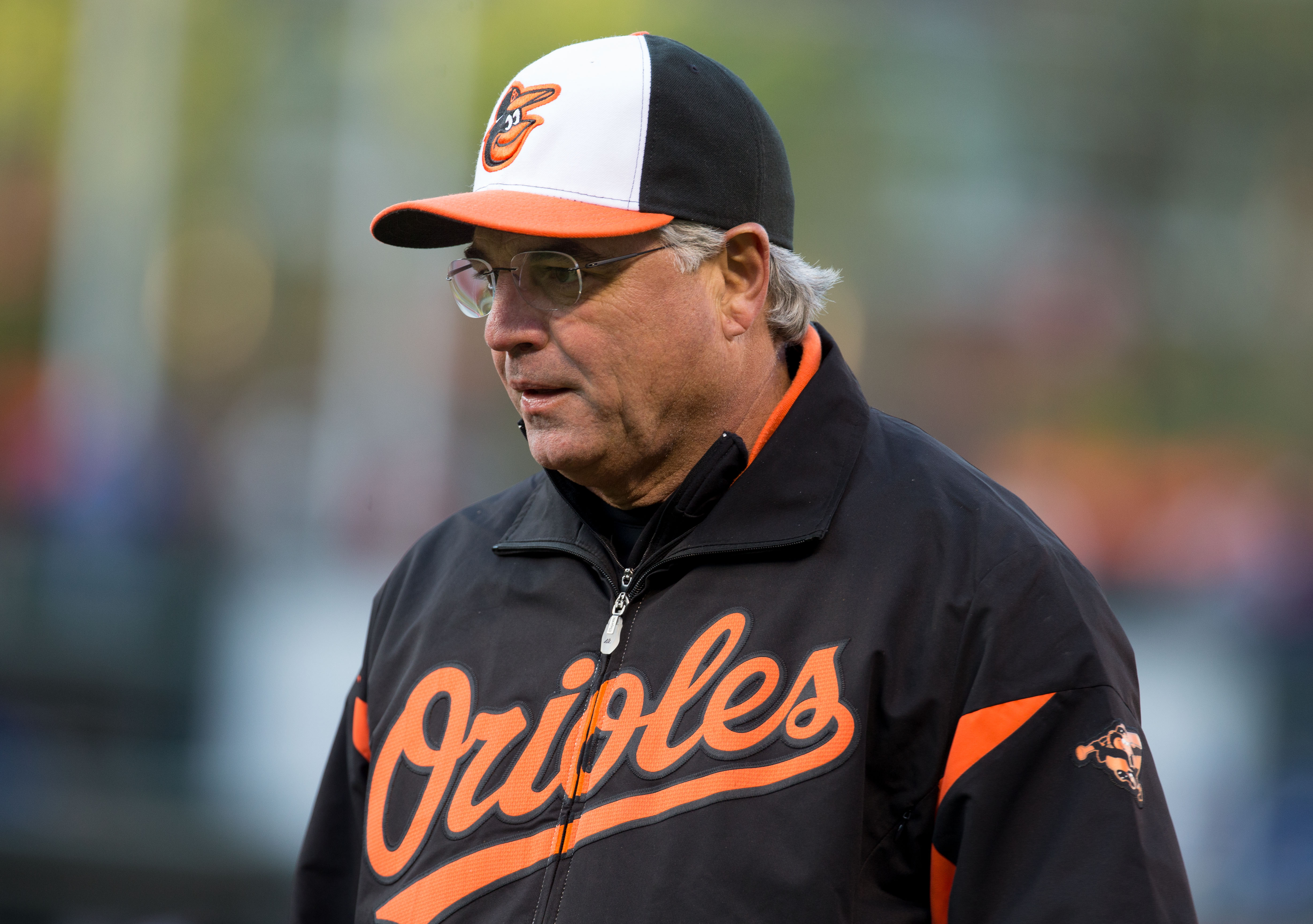
- Pitching coach
- Born: January 19, 1958 (age 68); Spartanburg, South Carolina, U.S.
- Bats: Left Throws: Left
- Stats at Baseball Reference

Teams
- Cleveland Indians (1992–1993); Detroit Tigers (1996–1999); Seattle Mariners (2009–2010); Baltimore Orioles (2011–2013)

Michael Richard Adair (/əˈdɛər/ ə-DAIR; born January 19, 1958) is an American former professional baseball coach and former player.

== Playing career ==
As a player, Adair played college baseball at Western Carolina University and was drafted by the Seattle Mariners in the third round of the 1979 Major League Baseball draft. Injuries ended his career seven years later, having peaked at the Triple-A level.

== Coaching career ==
He has held various coaching jobs since the end of his playing career, mostly as a minor-league pitching coach, with the Cleveland Indians, San Diego Padres, Detroit Tigers, Atlanta Braves, and Toronto Blue Jays organizations. He held major league coaching jobs with Cleveland, Detroit, and Seattle. Prior to being appointed to his former position with Seattle, Adair spent four seasons as a minor-league pitching coordinator for the Texas Rangers.

He was suspended on September 11, 1997, for 2 games after a postgame confrontation with the umpires.

Adair served as pitching coach for the Seattle Mariners. In 2011, he was hired as the bullpen coach for the Baltimore Orioles. Adair took over pitching coach Mark Connor's position after the latter resigned on June 14. Adair went on a leave of absence for personal reasons and was succeeded as pitching coach by Bill Castro on August 16, 2013.

== Personal ==
Adair is the nephew of former MLB pitcher and pitching coach Art Fowler.

Preceded by Mark Wiley	Cleveland Indians pitching coach 1992–1993	Succeeded by Phil Regan
Preceded by Jon Matlack	Detroit Tigers pitching coach 1996–1999	Succeeded by Dan Warthen
Preceded by Mel Stottlemyre	Seattle Mariners pitching coach 2009–2010	Succeeded by Carl Willis
Preceded by Alan Dunn	Baltimore Orioles bullpen coach 2011	Succeeded by Bill Castro
Preceded by Mark Connor	Baltimore Orioles pitching coach 2011–2013	Succeeded by Bill Castro
