= Steve Scarsone =

American baseball player (born 1966)

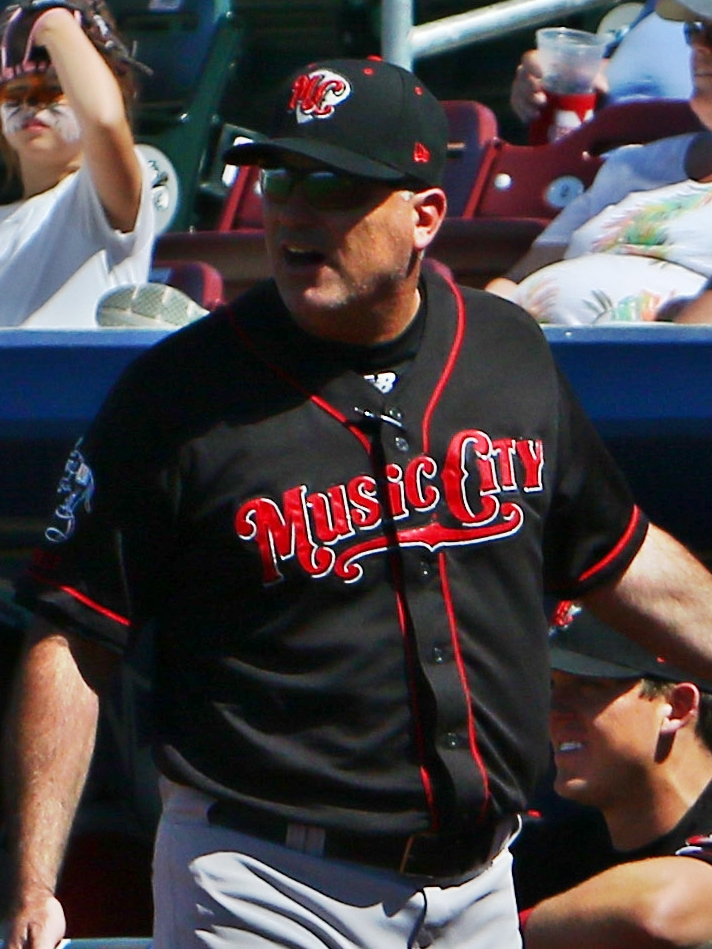
- Infielder
- Born: April 11, 1966 (age 60); Anaheim, California, U.S.
- Batted: Right Threw: Right

MLB debut
- May 15, 1992, for the Philadelphia Phillies

Last MLB appearance
- September 8, 1999, for the Kansas City Royals

MLB statistics
- Batting average: .239
- Home runs: 20
- Runs batted in: 86
- Stats at Baseball Reference

Teams
- Philadelphia Phillies (1992); Baltimore Orioles (1992); San Francisco Giants (1993–1996); St. Louis Cardinals (1997); Kansas City Royals (1999)

Steven Wayne Scarsone (born April 11, 1966) is an American former professional baseball infielder and former minor league manager. He serves on the Oakland Athletics' Player Development staff as travelling minor league instructor. He played all or parts of seven seasons in Major League Baseball (MLB) between 1992 and 1999 for the Philadelphia Phillies, Baltimore Orioles, San Francisco Giants, St. Louis Cardinals, and Kansas City Royals.

== Playing career ==
Scarsone attended Canyon High School in his native Anaheim and led the school to the 1984 California Interscholastic Federation championship. He was subsequently inducted into the school's hall of fame. He went on to attend Rancho Santiago College in Santa Ana, California.

He was drafted by the Philadelphia Phillies in the 2nd round of the 1986 MLB January Draft. His professional career began that year with the Class A (Short Season) Bend Phillies. He played for the Class A Charleston Wheelers in 1987, the Class A Clearwater Phillies in 1988, the Double-A Reading Phillies in 1989, and split the 1990 season between Clearwater and Reading. He played part of the 1991 season at Reading, but played the majority with the Triple-A Scranton/Wilkes-Barre Red Barons. He began the 1992 season with Scranton/Wilkes-Barre, but was called up to the Phillies where he made his major league debut on May 15. He recorded his first big league hit in the game against the Cincinnati Reds. He played in seven games before returning to Triple-A.

Scarsone was traded to the Baltimore Orioles for Juan Bell on August 11, 1992. He played 11 games with Baltimore, also spending time with their Triple-A affiliate Rochester Red Wings. On March 20, 1993, he was traded to the San Francisco Giants for Mark Leonard. Scarsone split time with the big league club and the Triple-A Phoenix Giants that year. He spent the entire 1994 to 1996 seasons with the major league squad. In 1995, his best statistical season, he had a .266 batting average with 11 home runs (more than half his career total) in 80 games played. Scarsone was promoted to a starting role early in the 1996 season but struggled at the plate; the Giants released him after the season ended.

He signed as a free agent with the St. Louis Cardinals in 1997. He appeared in five games with the major league team, spending most of his time with the Triple-A Louisville Redbirds. He was released on May 17, and signed a minor league contract with the San Diego Padres on May 20. He played the rest of the campaign with the Triple-A Las Vegas Stars. He was granted free agency after the season, and signed with the Anaheim Angels for 1998, playing the entire year with the Triple-A Vancouver Canadians. In 1999, Scarsone signed as a free agent with the Kansas City Royals. He played 18 games with the Triple-A Omaha Golden Spikes and 46 for the Royals, including his final major league game on September 8, 1999, before being released by the organization three days later.

In total, Scarsone appeared in 350 major league games, making 148 appearances at second base, 86 at third base, 36 at first base, and 19 at shortstop.

== Managerial career ==
After retiring from playing, Scarsone became manager of the Arizona Diamondbacks' Class A affiliate, the South Bend Silver Hawks of the Midwest League, in 2001. He was promoted to their Class A-Advanced Lancaster JetHawks of the California League in 2002.

In 2009, he began managing in the Oakland Athletics organization. Scarsone led the Class A Kane County Cougars to win the Midwest League's first-half title. His 2010 Stockton Ports (Class A-Advanced California League) captured the second-half title. Both the Cougars and Ports lost in their league's quarterfinals. Scarsone managed the Double-A Texas League's Midland RockHounds in 2011 and 2012. With the Triple-A Pacific Coast League's Sacramento River Cats, Scarsone's teams missed the playoffs by only two game in both 2013 and 2014. From 2015 to 2016, he managed the Triple-A Nashville Sounds, who became the Athletics' Triple-A farm club in 2015. Scarsone led the 2016 Sounds to win the American Southern Division title, and he won the PCL Manager of the Year Award.

Scarsone continued to hold roles in the A's organization through the 2024 season.
