= Sandy Guerrero =

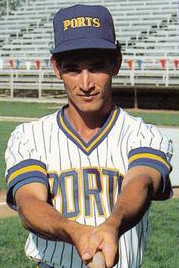
- Guerrero in 1988
- Infielder
- Born: April 6, 1966 (age 60); Santo Domingo, Dominican Republic
- Batted: Left Threw: Right

CPBL debut
- March 9, 1993, for the Brother Elephants

Last CPBL appearance
- 1996, for the Brother Elephants

CPBL statistics
- Batting average: .328
- Home runs: 30
- Runs batted in: 164
- Stats at Baseball Reference

Teams
- Brother Elephants (1993–1996)

Career highlights and awards
- 2× Taiwan Series champion (1993, 1994)

Epifanio Obdulio "Sandy" Guerrero Jiménez (born April 6, 1966) is a Dominican former minor league baseball infielder, who currently serves as the Milwaukee Brewers minor league hitting coordinator for the 2013 season. Guerrero played for 19 seasons, mostly at second base. He is the son of Epy Guerrero and brother of Mike Guerrero.

== Playing career ==
Guerrero began his professional career in 1984 with the Toronto Blue Jays' Rookie League Gulf Coast Blue Jays. After playing there again in 1985, he was promoted to the Class A Ventura County Gulls in 1986. That same year, he moved to the Milwaukee Brewers organization. He played three seasons at Class A Stockton before advancing to the Double-A El Paso Diablos in 1989. He spent the entire 1990 season at El Paso, and was promoted to the Triple-A Denver Zephyrs in 1991. The majority of his 1992 season was played at Denver, but he also played nine games back in Double-A El Paso.

Guerrero played in Taiwan from 1993 to 1998, where he hit .300 or better on five of the six years there, winning five gold gloves at shortstop, four silver bats, one batting title (.361 avg), was MVP in 1994, and was a five time all-star. Guerrero is fluent in Mandarin.

The final four years of his playing career were spent in the Mexican League. He played for the Mexican League's Piratas de Campeche in 1999 (.326 avg) and 2000 (.301 avg) and Langosteros de Cancún in 2001 (.288 avg). Guerreo played parts of 2001 and 2002 with the Adirondack Lumberjacks of the independent Northern League. In 2002, his final professional season, he played for the Mexican League's Olmecas de Tabasco.

== Coaching career ==
After retiring from playing, Guerrero became involved with coaching in the minor leagues. He served as hitting coach for the Huntsville Stars, the Double-A affiliate of the Milwaukee Brewers, from 2003 to 2008, from 2009 to 2011 as the Triple-A Nashville sounds Hitting Coach. 2012 and 2013 as the Milwaukee Brewers minor league hitting coordinator. Following the completion of the 2010 Pacific Coast League season, Guerrero was added to the Milwaukee Brewers roster as an additional coach for the remainder of the season.

Guerrero was the batting practice pitcher for Prince Fielder and Corey Hart in the Home Run Derby in 2009 and 2010, respectively. He also pitched to Prince again in 2011 along with Brewers teammate Rickie Weeks. Most recently he pitched to Prince again as the BP pitcher in the 2012 All-Star Game at Kauffman Stadium.

Guerrero and Fielder won the Home Run Derby twice in 2009 and 2012. Guerrero was invited to 4 years of the Major League All-Star Game. In 2015, Sandy pitched once again to Prince Fielder in the 2015 MLB All Star Home Run Derby.
