= Kirk Champion =

American baseball coach

- Born: September 4, 1957 (age 68); Granite City, Illinois

Kirk Champion (born September 4, 1957) is an American Minor League Baseball coach in the Chicago White Sox organization. As of 2019, he serves as Chicago's director of minor league pitching instruction. He has also coached the United States national baseball team at the Baseball World Cup and Pan American Games.

== Coaching career ==
Champion graduated from Southwest Missouri State University with a bachelor's degree in elementary education. From 1979 to 1981, he was an assistant coach at the school while enrolled as a student. He left for Rend Lake Junior College in 1982 where he served as head coach through 1985. From 1986 to 1988, he was an assistant coach at Southern Illinois University Carbondale.

Champion was hired by the Chicago White Sox to serve as pitching coach for their Class A South Bend White Sox in 1989. In 1992, he was promoted to the Class A-Advanced Sarasota White Sox. In 1993, he was moved up to the Double-A Birmingham Barons. He remained with Birmingham through 1996, after which he was sent up to the Triple-A Nashville Sounds. The White Sox retained Champion at Triple-A when they moved their top affiliation to the Calgary Cannons in 1998 and the Charlotte Knights from 1999 to 2002. He was selected as the pitching coach for the World Team in the 2000 All-Star Futures Game and the International League team at the 2001 Triple-A All-Star Game.

In 2003, Champion became the White Sox' minor league pitching coordinator, a position he held through 2011. From 2012 to 2016, he served as Chicago's minor league field coordinator. He participated in the 2016 All-Star Futures Game as pitching coach of the U.S. Team. He became their director of minor league instruction in 2017. Since 2018, he has been Chicago's director of minor league pitching instruction.

== International career ==
Champion served as the United States national baseball team pitching coach in the 2001 Baseball World Cup, 2008 Olympic qualifying tournament, 2009 Baseball World Cup, 2011 Baseball World Cup, and 2011 Pan American Games. He also coached pitchers in the Venezuelan Winter League in 1990, 1992, and 1993.

== Personal ==
Champion is the brother of Keith Champion, an advance scout for the San Francisco Giants and former player in the St. Louis Cardinals organization.
