= Stan Kyles =

American baseball player and coach

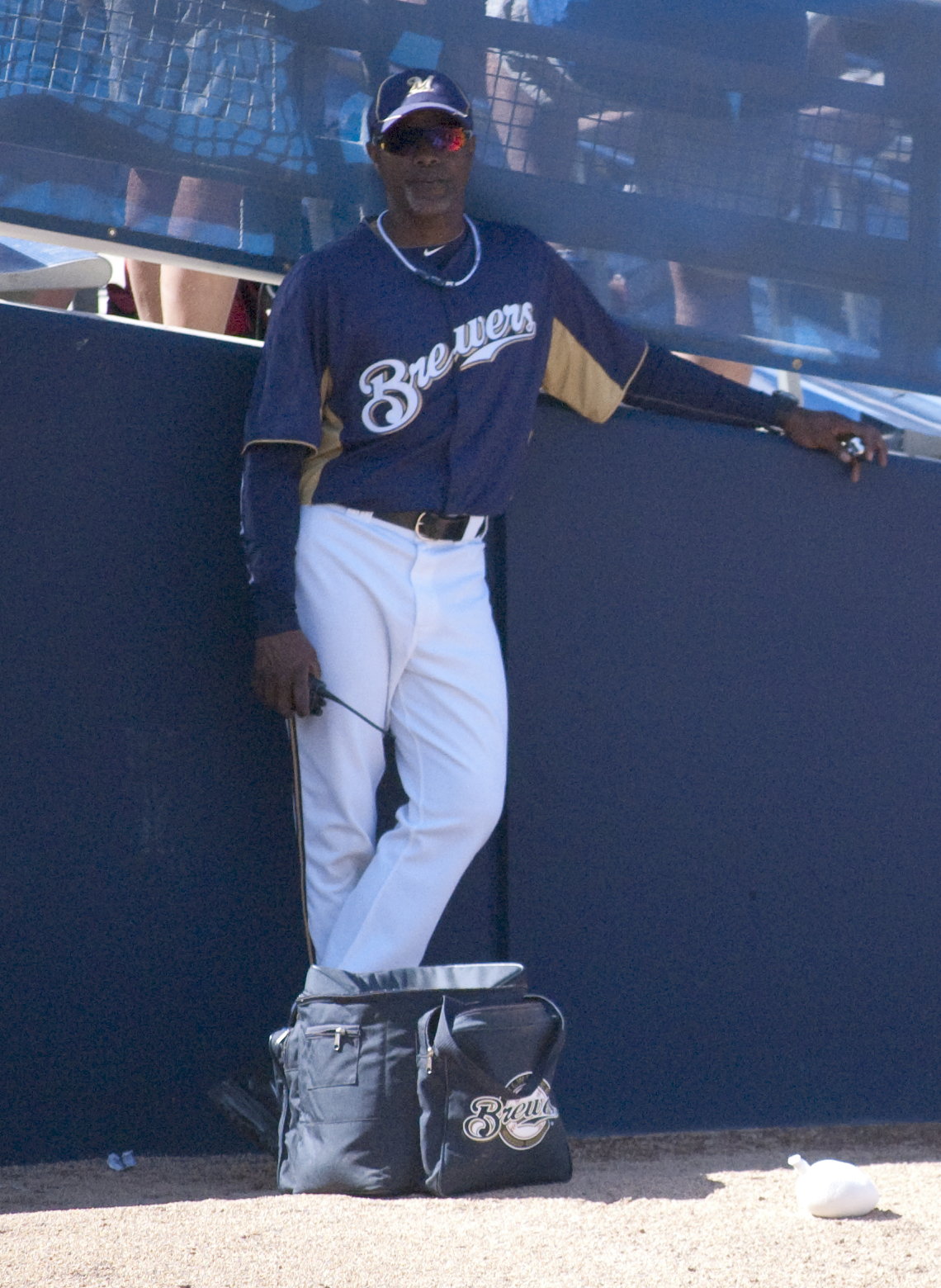
- Kyles at Brewers spring training in 2011
- Pitcher / coach
- Born: February 26, 1961 (age 65); Chicago, Illinois, U.S.
- Bats: Right Throws: Right
- Stats at Baseball Reference

Teams
- Milwaukee Brewers (2009–2012)

Stanley Kyles (born February 26, 1961) is an American former professional baseball pitcher and coach who served as the bullpen coach for the Milwaukee Brewers of Major League Baseball (MLB) from 2009 to 2012.

== Playing career ==
Kyles was selected in the 4th round (90th overall pick) by the Chicago Cubs in the 1979 amateur entry draft. That year he played his first season for the Rookie league Gulf Coast Cubs.

The next year, he played for the Class A-Low Geneva Cubs. He started 1981 off with Geneva before advancing to the Class A Quad City Cubs. In 1982, he played for the Class A-Advanced Salinas Spurs and recorded an 11–5 record with a 2.51 ERA and pitched 118 strikeouts. In 1983, he played for both the Double-A Midland Cubs and the Triple-A Iowa Cubs.

He was traded from the Cubs to the Oakland Athletics for Tim Stoddard during spring training on March 26, 1984, with minor league outfielder Stan Boderick also sent to the A's to complete the transaction five days later on March 31. His time in the Athletics organization began at its Double-A club, the Albany-Colonie A's. He advanced to their Triple-A club, the Tacoma Tigers, the following season. In 1986, he split the season between Tacoma and Oakland's new Double-A affiliate, the Huntsville Stars. He spent 1987, his last season with Oakland, at Tacoma.

Kyles switched organizations in 1988, playing for the Los Angeles Angels of Anaheim's Triple-A club, the Albuquerque Dukes. In 1989, his final season as a player, Kyles played for two different organizations' Double-A clubs: the San Francisco Giants' Shreveport Captains and the Milwaukee Brewers' El Paso Diablos.

After 11 seasons as a professional pitcher in the minor leagues, playing in 279 games, Kyles retired. His career totals include a 52–56 record, a 3.86 ERA, and 508 strikeouts.

== Coaching career ==
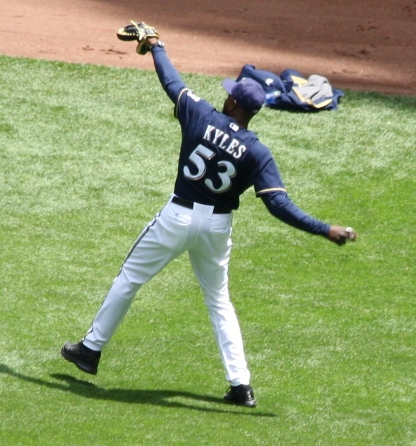
Warming up a starting pitcher in 2011

After retiring from playing, Kyles became involved with coaching in 1991. He worked in the Chicago Cubs' and Colorado Rockies' farm system prior to joining the Milwaukee Brewers organization, as a pitching coach, in 2001. His first season at the Triple-A level was 2004 with the Indianapolis Indians. The next season, the Brewers switched their top affiliate to the Nashville Sounds of the Pacific Coast League. In his first year with Nashville, the team captured the league's championship. In 2006 and 2007, his pitching staff lead the league in ERA.

After the regular 2006 season, Kyles served as the pitching coach for the Mexican Winter League's Naranjeros de Hermosillo, which won the league championship.

On Nov. 12, 2008, Kyles was named the new Milwaukee Brewers bullpen coach, replacing Bill Castro who was promoted to pitching coach. On April 20, 2010, news surfaced that Kyles was diagnosed with prostate cancer, and would be undergoing treatment on April 23. On May 25, 2010, he returned as the Brewers bullpen coach. On July 30, 2012, he was let go as the Brewers bullpen coach.
