= Ricardo Aponte =

United States general

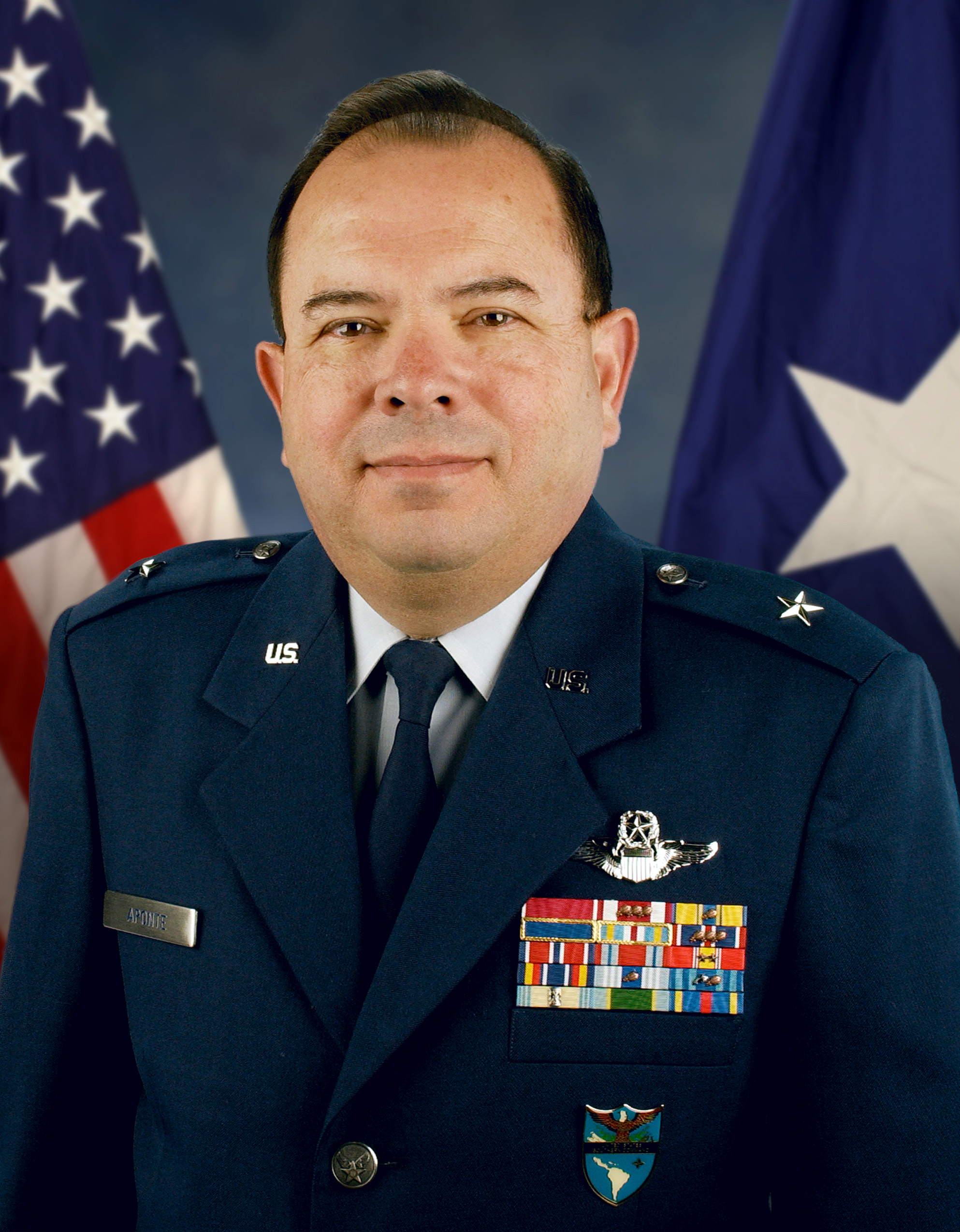
- Brigadier General Ricardo Aponte
- Born: 1949 (age 76–77); San Juan, Puerto Rico
- Military career
- Allegiance: United States of America
- Branch: United States Air Force; Air Force Reserve
- Service years: 1972–2007
- Rank: Brigadier general
- Nickname: Rico
- Units: 27th Special Operations Wing, 48th Tactical Fighter Wing, 523rd Tactical Fighter Squadron
- Commands: United States Southern Command
- Awards: Defense Superior Service Medal; Legion of Merit; Meritorious Service Medal (4); Air Force Commendation Medal (2); Combat Readiness Medal; National Defense Service Medal (3); Global War on Terrorism Expeditionary Medal; Global War on Terrorism Service Medal; Armed Forces Reserve Medal

Brigadier General Ricardo "Rico" Aponte (born c. 1949) is a United States Air Force officer who was the first Hispanic director, J-7, of the United States Southern Command, located in Miami, Florida.

== Early years ==
Aponte was raised and educated in San Juan, the capital of Puerto Rico. After receiving his primary and secondary education, he enrolled in the University of Puerto Rico at Mayagüez and joined the campus ROTC program. On December 29, 1972, he earned a Bachelor of Science degree in civil engineering and was commissioned a second lieutenant in the United States Air Force.

== Assignments ==
Aponte was assigned to Moody Air Force Base in the state of Georgia and completed his pilot training in August 1974. He was then reassigned to the 27th Tactical Fighter Wing at Cannon Air Force Base, New Mexico as pilot-weapons system officer and aircraft commander General Dynamics F-111D. He was promoted to first lieutenant on May 1, 1975. Aponte flew the F-111 F and D models, the 02-A and T-38 aircraft.

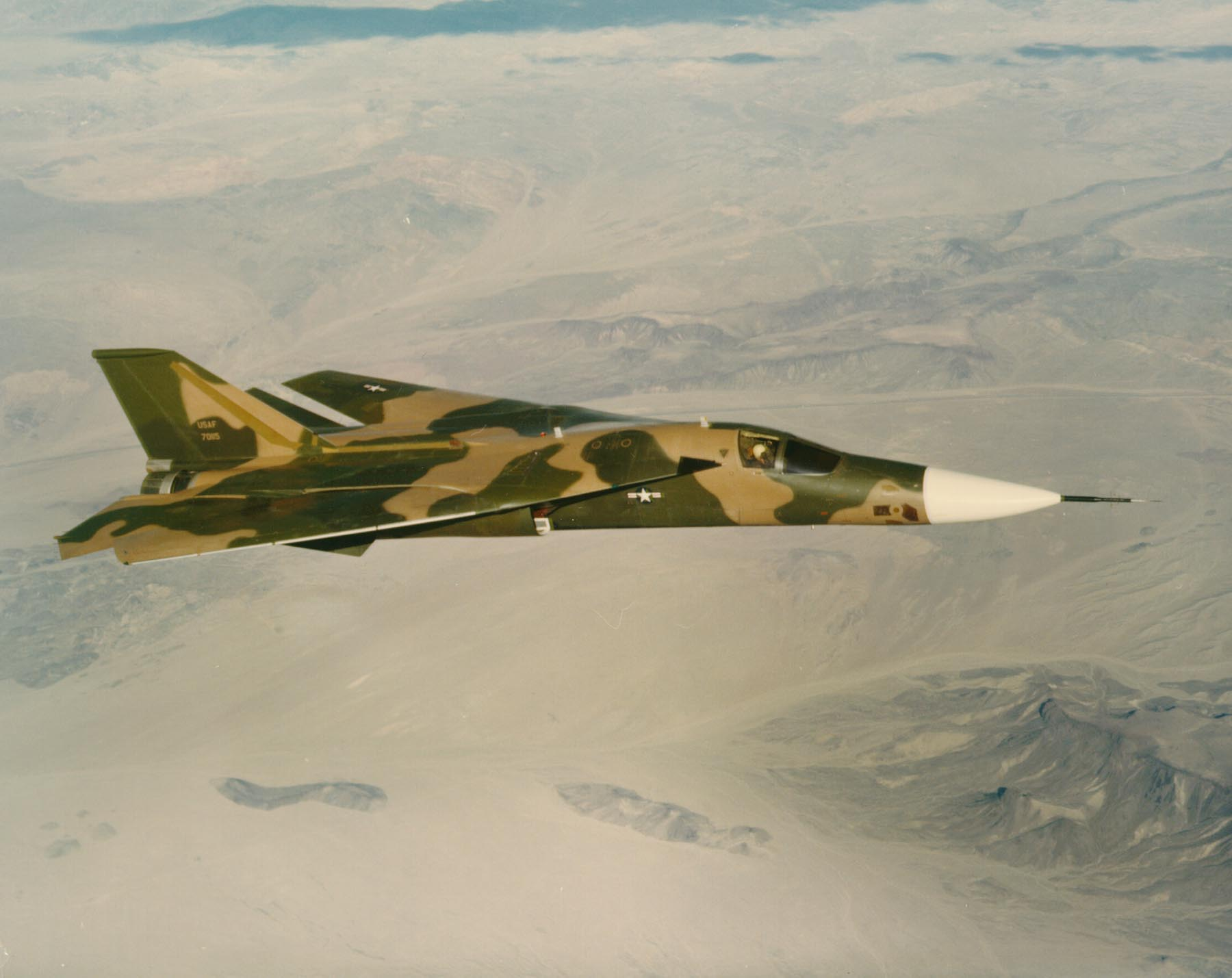
F-111 – Type of aircraft flown by Aponte

Aponte became a captain on May 1, 1977, and served as aircraft commander and instructor pilot of the F-111F aircraft of the 48th Tactical Fighter Wing, Royal Air Force Lakenheath in the United Kingdom from August 1978 to May 1981. During this period, he earned his Master of Science degree in management science from Troy State University.

In May 1981, he returned to the United States and served as instructor pilot of the 0-2A aircraft, assigned to the 549th Tactical Air Support Training Squadron at Patrick Air Force Base in Florida. During this period, Aponte attended the United States Marine Corps Weapons and Tactics Instructor School in Marine Corps Air Station Yuma located in Arizona, the United States Air Force Squadron Officer's School and United States Air Force Air Command and Staff College (the latter two by correspondence). He served at Patrick Air Force Base until May 1984, when he was sent to Howard Air Force Base in Panama. Aponte was promoted to major on October 1, 1984, and was the chief of the Latin American Political Military Affairs Division and deputy director for Latin American Affairs.

In June 1988, Aponte was reassigned to Cannon Air Force Base in New Mexico, where he served as aircraft commander F111-D, 523rd Tactical Fighter Squadron and from 1989 to December 1989 as chief, Quality Assurance of 27th Tactical Fighter Group.

== Air Force Reserve ==
In August 1990, Aponte joined the Air Force Reserve and was assigned to deputy chief of staff for air and space operations Western Hemisphere Division in the Pentagon in Washington, D.C. At the Pentagon, Aponte was the international political officer who led the reserve officers assigned to the Western Hemisphere, European and Defense Attached Directorates. In 1992, the U.S. Air Force Demonstration Squadron, The Thunderbirds, selected him as the Spanish Language Narrator for their highly successful Latin America Tour. He was promoted to lieutenant colonel on June 18, 1993, and completed by seminar Air War College in 1994. From November 1999 to January 2001, he served as individual mobilization augmentee to Deputy Under Secretary International Affairs. He was promoted to the rank of colonel on August 1, 1997.

In January 2001, he was assigned as a mobilization assistant to the deputy to the Chief Air Force Reserve. There he led transformation efforts and was a tiger team member in response to frequent mobilization and demobilization issues resulting from Operations Enduring Freedom and Iraqi Freedom.

== United States Southern Command ==
In April 2003, Aponte became the deputy director for operations, Headquarters United States Southern Command in Miami, Florida. Aponte was promoted to brigadier general on March 1, 2003. In October 2004, he was named director, J-7, of the United States Southern Command.

His directorate is the focal point for transformation initiatives, knowledge management, experimentation and gaming within the U. S. Southern Command. The directorate seeks out new concepts and rigorously tests them both in simulation and as part of operational experiments. The first transformation initiative was the startup of the Secretary of Defense mandated Standing Joint Force Headquarters (SJFHQ). The SJFHQ, consists of planning, operations, knowledge management, and information superiority experts who form the backbone of the Joint Task Force command structure in the event of contingency operations. Aponte retired July 1, 2007.

== Personal ==
In the 2024 United States presidential election, Aponte endorsed Kamala Harris.

== Awards and decorations ==
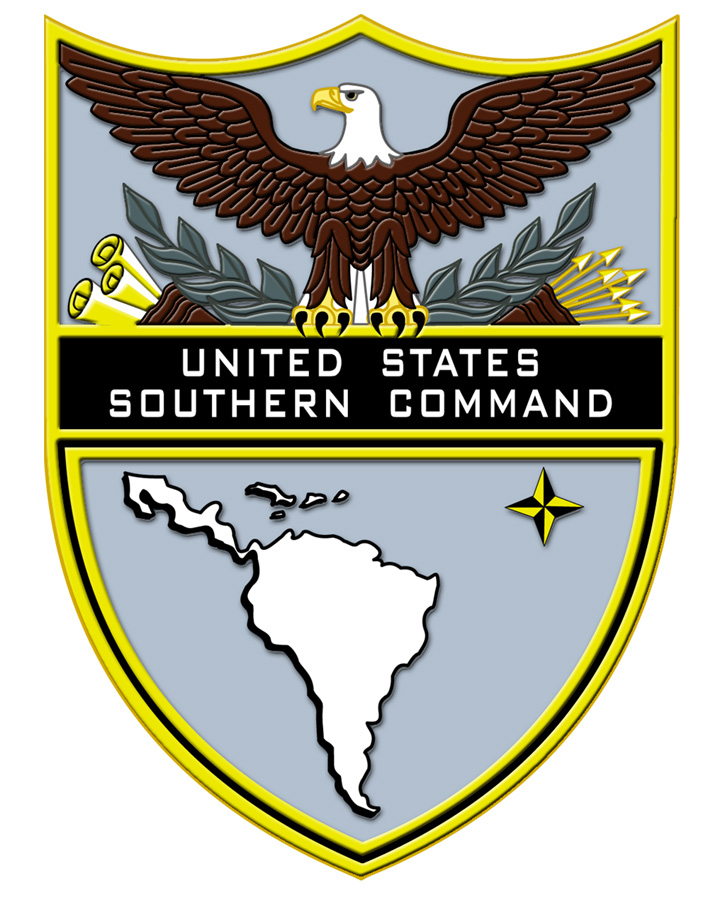
| Command Pilot Badge |
| Headquarters Air Force Badge |
| US Southern Command badge |

| Defense Superior Service Medal |
| Legion of Merit |
| Meritorious Service Medal with three bronze oak leaf clusters |
| Air Force Commendation Medal with bronze oak leaf cluster |
| Presidential Unit Citation |
| Joint Meritorious Unit Award |
| Air Force Outstanding Unit Award with three bronze oak leaf clusters |
| Air Force Organizational Excellence Award |
| Combat Readiness Medal |
| National Defense Service Medal with two bronze service star |
| Global War on Terrorism Expeditionary Medal |
| Global War on Terrorism Service Medal |
| Air Force Overseas Long Tour Service Ribbon with bronze oak leaf cluster |
| Air Force Longevity Service Award with silver and bronze oak leaf clusters |
| Armed Forces Reserve Medal with silver hourglass device |
| Small Arms Expert Marksmanship Ribbon |
| Air Force Training Ribbon |

== Effective dates of promotions ==
| Rank | Date |
|---|---|
| Second Lieutenant | December 29, 1972 |
| First Lieutenant | May 1, 1975 |
| Captain | May 1, 1977 |
| Major | October 1, 1984 |
| Lieutenant Colonel | June 18, 1993 |
| Colonel | August 1, 1997 |
| Brigadier General | March 1, 2003 |

== See also ==
- List of Puerto Ricans
- List of Puerto Rican military personnel
- Hispanics in the United States Air Force
- University of Puerto Rico at Mayaguez people
