= Bill Castro =

Dominican baseball player (born 1952)

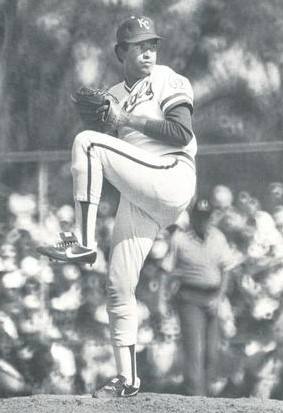
- Pitcher
- Born: March 29, 1952 (age 72); Santiago, Dominican Republic
- Batted: Right Threw: Right

MLB debut
- August 20, 1974, for the Milwaukee Brewers

Last MLB appearance
- June 25, 1983, for the Kansas City Royals

MLB statistics
- Win–loss record: 31–26
- Earned run average: 3.33
- Strikeouts: 203
- Stats at Baseball Reference

Teams
- As player: Milwaukee Brewers (1974–1980); New York Yankees (1981); Kansas City Royals (1982–1983); As coach: Milwaukee Brewers (1992–2009); Baltimore Orioles (2012–2013)

Career highlights and awards
- Milwaukee Brewers Wall of Honor

William Radhames Castro Checo (born March 29, 1952) is a Dominican former professional baseball pitcher and former pitching coach for the Milwaukee Brewers of both the American League and National League. He was the interim pitching coach with the Baltimore Orioles of the American League. Gary Thorne of MASN reported in the broadcast of the August 27, 2013 game between the Orioles and the Boston Red Sox that Castro succeeded Rick Adair because Adair had taken a leave of absence for personal reasons starting in August 2013. Gary Thorne, broadcasting the game between the Orioles and the Los Angeles Angels on July 5, 2012, on MASN, announced that Castro became unavailable for that game because of a death in his family and returned home to the Dominican Republic.

Castro was drafted by the Brewers – then in the American League – and pitched for them from 1974 to 1980. He played three more years with the New York Yankees and Kansas City Royals before retiring. He was traded from the Yankees to the California Angels for Butch Hobson during spring training on March 24, 1982.

The longest-serving member of the Brewers' coaching staff, Castro was named bullpen coach in 1992 by rookie manager Phil Garner. Late in the 2002 season, Castro also briefly served as pitching coach after the resignation of Dave Stewart. He then returned to his bullpen role until he was named pitching coach by new Milwaukee manager Ken Macha on November 7, 2008. The 2009 season marked Castro's 18th consecutive season as a Brewer coach. Castro was subsequently fired as pitching coach on August 12, 2009, and replaced with former Brewer Chris Bosio.

Castro was the pitching coach for the Dominican Republic's entry in the inaugural World Baseball Classic.

Preceded by Stan Kyles	Milwaukee Brewers bullpen coach 1992-2008	Succeeded by Ray Burris
Preceded by Chris Bosio (interim)	Milwaukee Brewers pitching coach 2009	Succeeded by Mike Maddux
Preceded by Rick Adair	Baltimore Orioles bullpen coach 2012–2013	Succeeded by Scott McGregor (interim)
Preceded by Rick Adair	Baltimore Orioles pitching coach (interim); 2013	Succeeded by Dave Wallace
