= Mike Guerrero =

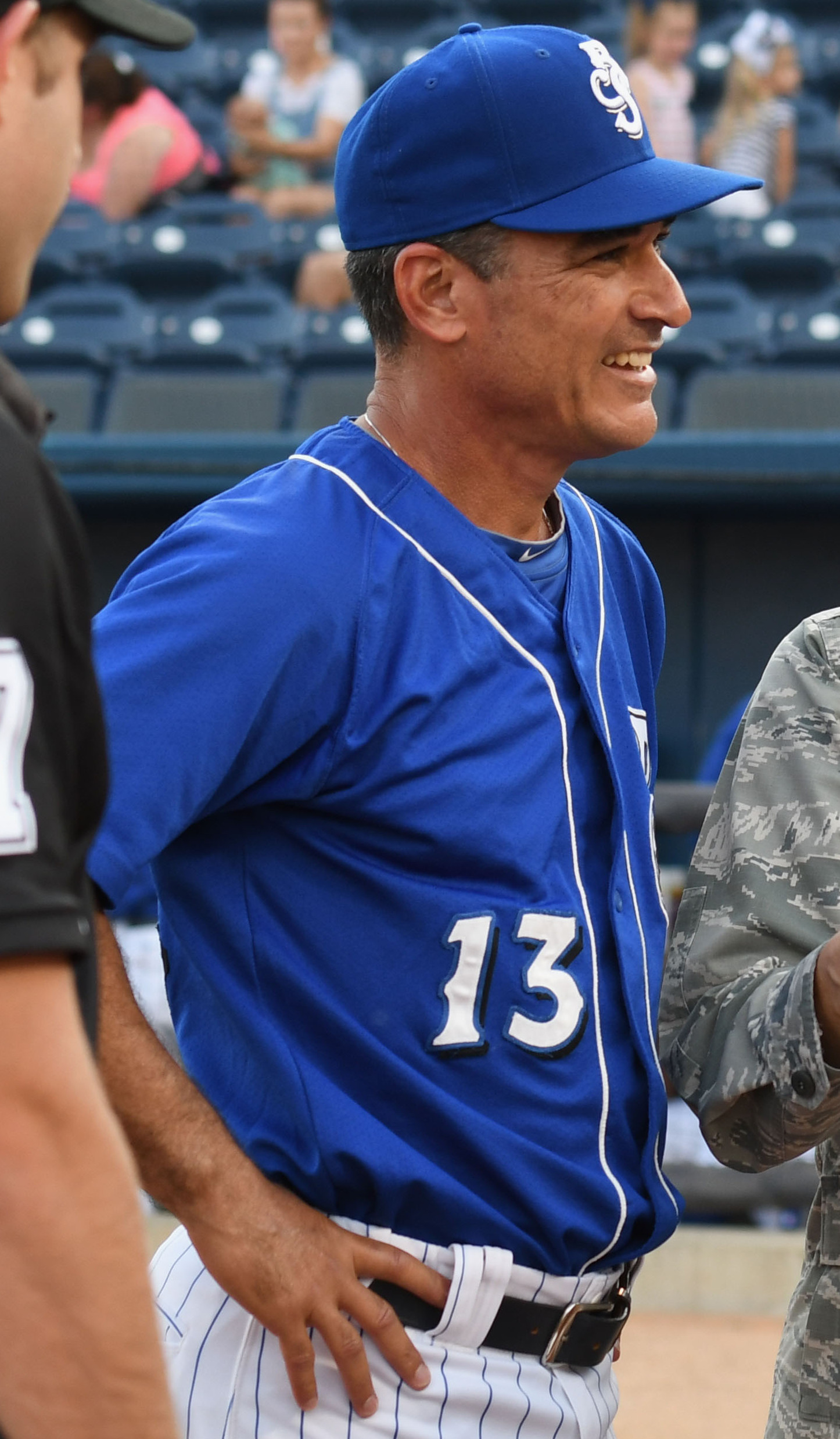
- Guerrero with the Biloxi Shuckers in 2018
- Manager
- Born: January 8, 1968 (age 58); Santo Domingo, Dominican Republic
- Bats: Right Throws: Right

CPBL statistics
- Batting average: .317
- Home runs: 0
- Runs batted in: 4
- Stats at Baseball Reference

Teams
- Wei Chuan Dragons (1994); As coach: Milwaukee Brewers (2014–2015)

Miguel Alberto "Mike" Guerrero (born January 8, 1968) is a Dominican former Major League Baseball coach with the Milwaukee Brewers from 2014 to 2015 and a former minor league player in the Brewers and Kansas City Royals farm systems from 1987 to 1995. He managed in the Brewers organization from 2004 to 2022 before becoming a roving infield instructor in 2024.

== Playing career ==
Guerrero played his first professional season in 1987 for the Rookie league Helena Brewers. In 1988, he played for Helena, the Rookie league Arizona League Brewers, and the Class A Beloit Snappers. He played for Arizona and Beloit again in 1989, as well as for the Class A-Advanced Stockton Ports. Guerrero spent the entire 1990 season with Stockton. He split the 1991 between Stockton and the Double-A El Paso Diablos. He stayed with the Diablos for all of the 1992 season.

Prior to the 1993 season, Guerrero was acquired by the Kansas City Royals organization. He played his first season for them with the Class A-Advanced Wilmington Blue Rocks and Double-A Memphis Chicks. Guerrero was re-acquired by the Brewers in 1994. He split the year between Stockton and El Paso. He played 23 games in 1995, his last year as a player, for the Diablos.

During his playing career, Guerrero spent most of his time playing shortstop but also spent considerable time as a second baseman and third baseman. He filled-in as a first baseman and outfielder for one game each. He also pitched in three games (3.1 innings).

== Managerial career ==
Guerrero began his managerial career in the Dominican Summer League with the Toronto Blue Jays' DSL Blue Jays in 1995. He then joined the Milwaukee Brewers' organization, serving as skipper of the DSL Brewers from 1996 to 2002. He led the 2001 team to win the league title and was named DSL Manager of the Year. In 2004, he joined Brewers' Rookie league Arizona League Brewers. He led the team to a 24–32 (.429) finish is his first season. He stayed with the team for the 2005 season in which they compiled a record of 22–34 (.393). The Brewers moved Guerrero up to their Class A affiliate, the West Virginia Power, for 2006. In his first year with the Power, Guerrero led the team to a 74–62 (.544) finish. In 2007, he guided West Virginia to an 82–54 (.603) record. The team went on to with the Northern Division Championship after defeating the Hickory Crawdads, two games to one. Eventually, the Power lost the South Atlantic League Championship to the Columbus Catfish in three straight games.

He was promoted to helm the Class A-Advanced Brevard County Manatees. In 2008, the team finished with a 66–72 (.478) record. Guerrero returned to postseason action in 2009 (79–48 (.622)). However, the Manatees fell to the Tampa Yankees, losing the North Division title. Guerrero was honored by being named to the 2009 Florida State League postseason All-Star Team as a coach.

Guerrero was selected to manage the Double-A Huntsville Stars in 2010. His first season saw the Stars compile a 67–73 (.479) season. Returning in 2011, Huntsville recorded a 64–73 (.467) record. Guerrero managed the Triple-A Nashville Sounds, Milwaukee's top farm club, from 2012 to 2013. He held a major league coaching position with the Brewers from 2014 to 2015. Guerrero returned to manage Milwaukee's Double-A club, then the Biloxi Shuckers, from 2016 to 2022. He became a roving infield instructor in the Brewers organization in 2024. In 2026, Guerrero was again named manager of the Biloxi Shuckers the Brewers Double-A affiliate.

== Personal ==
Guerrero is the brother of Sandy Guerrero.
