= Edgar Cáceres =

Venezuelan baseball player (born 1964)

- Second baseman
- Born: June 6, 1964 (age 62); Barquisimeto, Lara State, Venezuela
- Batted: Switch Threw: Right

MLB debut
- June 8, 1995, for the Kansas City Royals

Last MLB appearance
- October 1, 1995, for the Kansas City Royals

MLB statistics
- Batting average: .239
- Home runs: 1
- Runs batted in: 17

KBO statistics
- Batting average: .250
- Home runs: 5
- Runs batted in: 53
- Stats at Baseball Reference

Teams
- Kansas City Royals (1995); OB Bears / Doosan Bears (1998–1999)

Edgar Fidel Cáceres (born June 6, 1964) is a Venezuelan former Major League Baseball second baseman and switch-hitter.

== Career ==
Cáceres played in Major League Baseball (MLB) for the Kansas City Royals as a replacement player during the 1995 season. He also played in the KBO League for the OB Bears / Doosan Bears.

In a 55-game career, Cáceres batted .239 with one home run, 17 RBI, 13 runs, six doubles, two triples and two stolen bases.

== See also ==
- List of Major League Baseball players from Venezuela
