= Jack Lind =

American baseball player (born 1946)

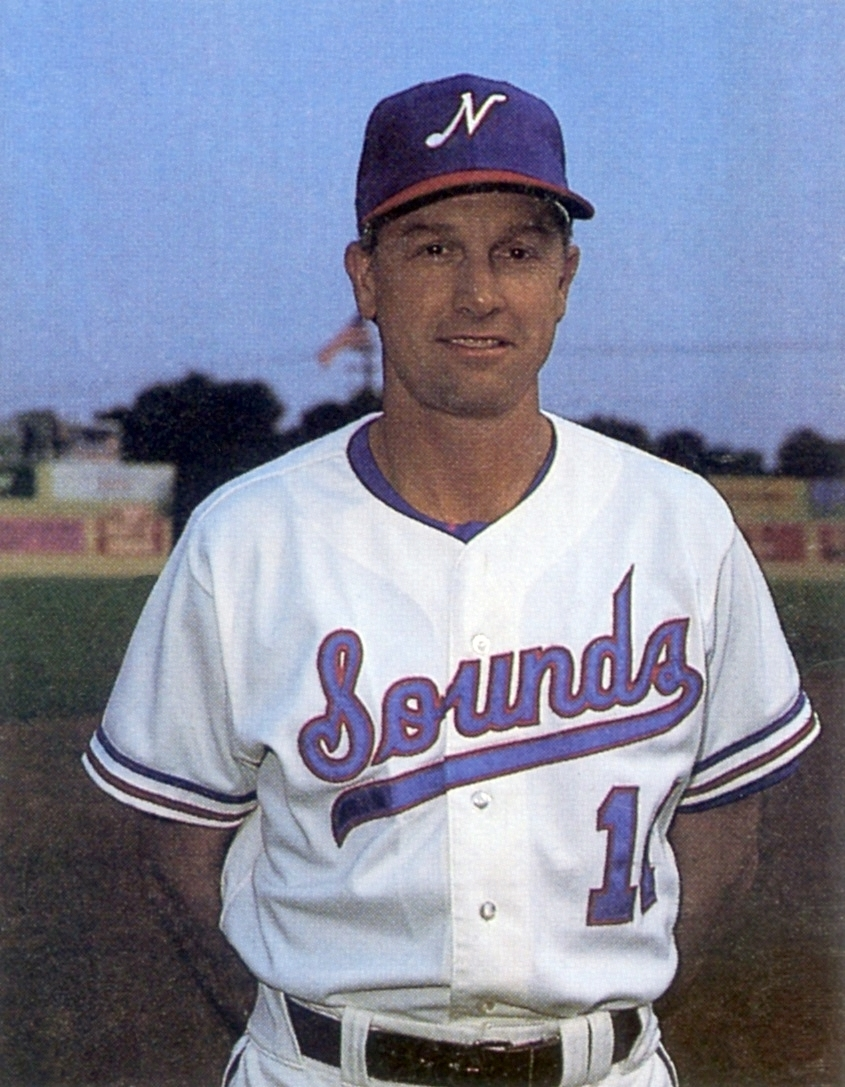
- Lind with the Nashville Sounds in 1987
- Infielder
- Born: June 8, 1946 (age 80); Denver, Colorado, U.S.
- Batted: Switch Threw: Right

MLB debut
- September 10, 1974, for the Milwaukee Brewers

Last MLB appearance
- September 22, 1975, for the Milwaukee Brewers

MLB statistics
- Batting average: .135
- Home runs: 0
- Runs batted in: 1

NPB statistics
- Batting average: .237
- Home runs: 9
- Runs batted in: 23
- Stats at Baseball Reference

Teams
- Milwaukee Brewers (1974–1975); Yomiuri Giants (1977)

Jackson Hugh Lind (born June 8, 1946) is an American former Major League Baseball shortstop, first baseman, second baseman, and third baseman. He played during two seasons at the major league level for the Milwaukee Brewers, as well as one season in Japan for the Yomiuri Giants. He was drafted by the Houston Astros in the 7th round of the secondary phase of the 1967 Major League Baseball draft.

After retiring from playing, Lind began a managing career in the minor leagues. He won league championships in his first three seasons as a minor league manager: 1983 with the Redwood Pioneers and 1984 and 1985 with the Vermont Reds. Most recently, he managed the Lexington Legends in 2006. He also served as the third base coach for Pittsburgh Pirates from 1997 to 2000.

German baseball club Buchbinder Legionäre Regensburg signed Lind as hitting coach and infield coach in 2017.

Jack is a 1964 graduate of Mesa High School in Mesa, Arizona. He is the father of Zach Lind, drummer of the band Jimmy Eat World.
