= Trent Jewett =

American baseball coach (born 1964)

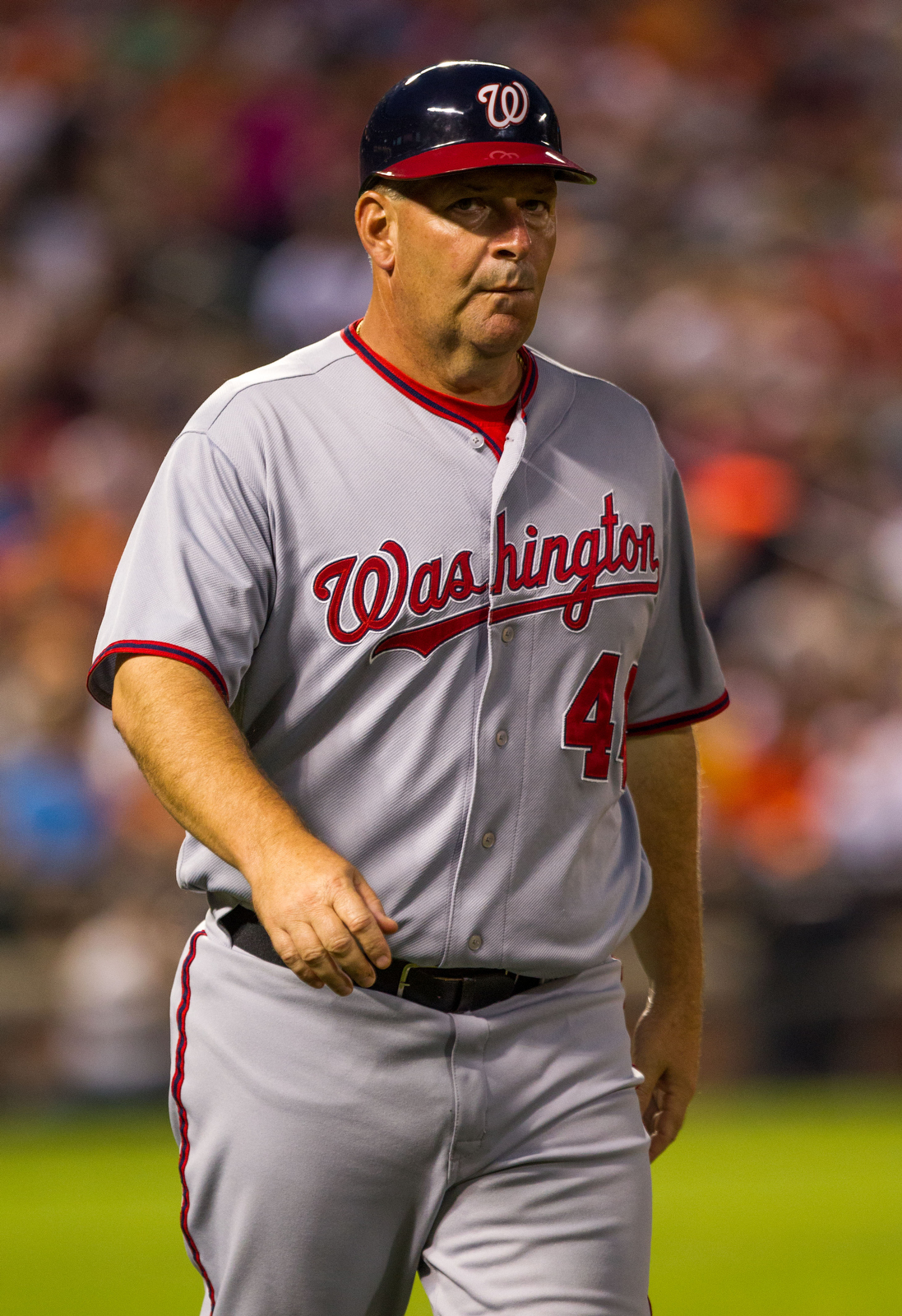
- Jewett with the Washington Nationals
- Coach
- Born: March 3, 1964 (age 61); Dallas, Texas, U.S.
- Bats: Right Throws: Right

Teams
- Pittsburgh Pirates (2000–2002); Washington Nationals (2011–2013); Seattle Mariners (2014–2015)

Philip Trent Jewett (born March 3, 1964) is an American baseball coach and former minor league baseball player. He recently served as the bench coach for the Seattle Mariners from 2014 to 2015. He spent 2013 as the third-base coach of the Washington Nationals. Jewett joined the Nationals' coaching staff at the beginning of 2011 as a Major League coach, and later spent part of 2011 and all of 2012 as the Nationals' first-base coach.

== Playing career ==
Jewett graduated from R.L. Turner High School, Carrollton, Texas, in 1982, and went on to the University of North Texas where he majored in business and played on the baseball team as catcher. He earned a Bachelor of Business Administration in 1988.

Jewett spent four seasons in the Pirates farm system as a catcher. For his career he had a .172 batting average with two HR and 26 RBI in 113 career games.

== Minor-league manager ==
Jewett spent 17 years as a manager in Minor League Baseball, mostly in the Pittsburgh Pirates organization, including nine and a half seasons managing at the Triple-A level. Jewett has an overall MiLB managerial record of 1,178 wins and 1,166 losses for a winning percentage of .503. He won division titles in 1995 (Carolina Mudcats), 2003 (Nashville Sounds) and 2006 (Indianapolis Indians), and he led the Carolina Mudcats to the 1995 Southern League pennant.

He managed the Triple-A Calgary Cannons from 1996 to 1997, the Nashville Sounds from 1998 to 2000 and 2003 to 2004, and when the Pirates changed their Triple-A affiliate from Nashville to Indianapolis, Jewett became the manager of the Indianapolis Indians from 2005 to 2008.

In 2009, Jewett began his first of two years as a manager in the Nationals' minor league system. He led their High-A affiliate, the Potomac Nationals, in 2009 before being promoted to manage the Triple-A Syracuse Chiefs for 2010.

== Coaching career ==
In the middle of the 2000 season, Jewett was promoted to the Pirates' major league team as a third base coach, a position he held in until the end of the 2002 season. This was his only hiatus from minor league managing until he joined the Nationals' major league coaching staff in 2011. On August 27, 2014, Jewett became interim manager for the weekend series against the Washington Nationals while Lloyd McClendon attended a wedding.

Sporting positions
Preceded by Dan Radison	Washington Nationals first base coach 2011–2012	Succeeded by Tony Tarasco
Preceded by Bo Porter	Washington Nationals third base coach 2013	Succeeded by Bob Henley
Preceded by Robby Thompson	Seattle Mariners bench coach 2014–2015	Succeeded by Tim Bogar
