= Jeff King (baseball) =

American baseball player (born 1964)

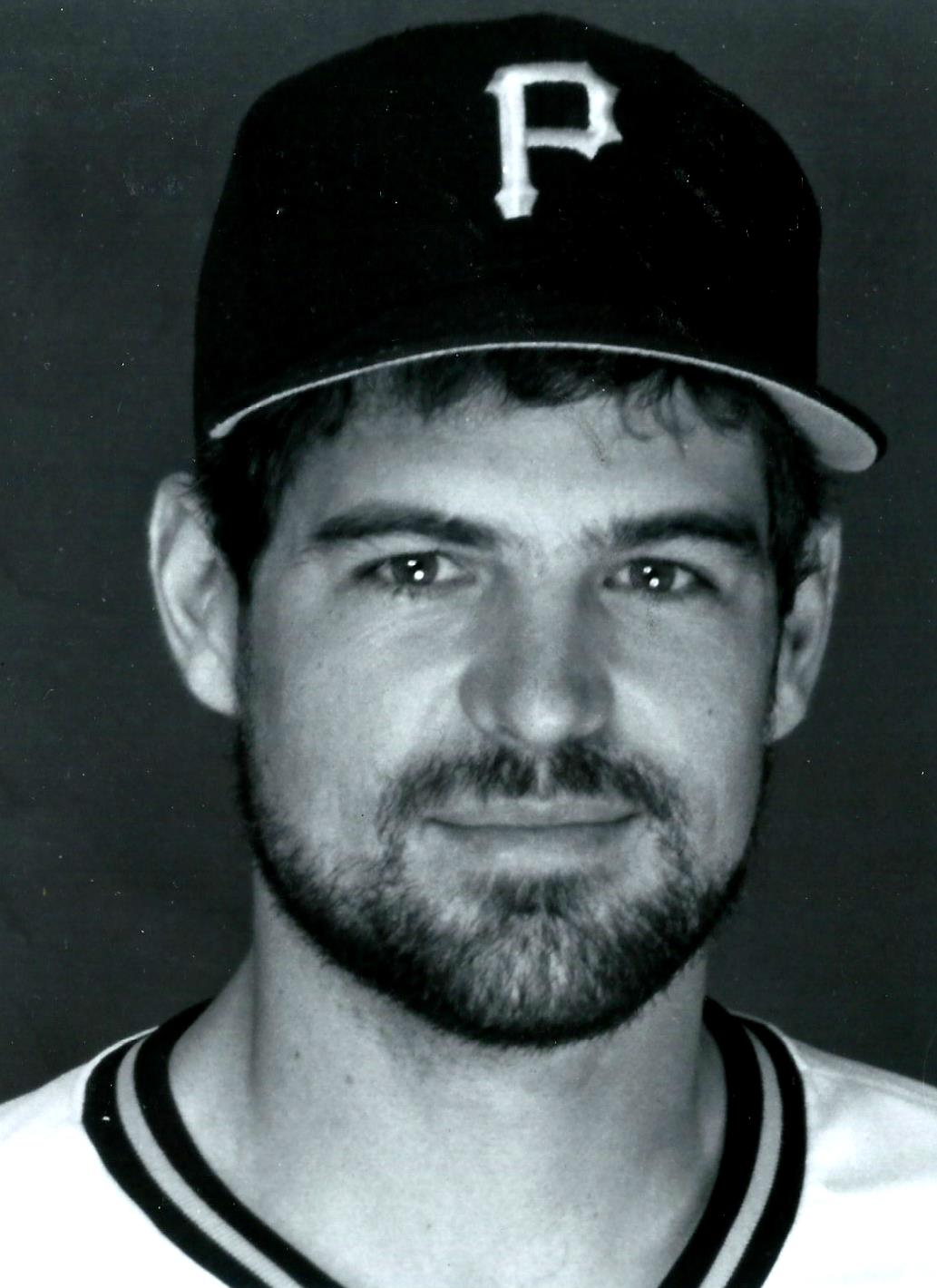
- Jeff King as a Pittsburgh Pirate
- Infielder
- Born: December 26, 1964 (age 61); Marion, Indiana, U.S.
- Batted: Right Threw: Right

MLB debut
- June 2, 1989, for the Pittsburgh Pirates

Last MLB appearance
- May 21, 1999, for the Kansas City Royals

MLB statistics
- Batting average: .256
- Home runs: 154
- Runs batted in: 709
- Stats at Baseball Reference

Teams
- Pittsburgh Pirates (1989–1996); Kansas City Royals (1997–1999)

Jeffrey Wayne King (born December 26, 1964) is an American former professional baseball player who played for the Pittsburgh Pirates and Kansas City Royals.

== Career ==
King graduated from Rampart High School in Colorado Springs in 1983. He was drafted first overall by Pittsburgh in the 1986 June Amateur Draft, after playing college ball at the University of Arkansas. He played his 1987–88 seasons with the Eastern League's Harrisburg Senators before being promoted to Pittsburgh.

King was a key part of the Pirates Division Championship teams of 1990, 1991, and 1992, batting 6th right after Barry Bonds, Andy Van Slyke and Bobby Bonilla. He was plagued by back injuries which forced Bonilla to play third base during the 1990 NLCS.

King was the third player—the first two being Willie McCovey and Andre Dawson—to hit two home runs in the same inning twice during his career. On August 8, 1995, he hit two home runs in the second inning of the Pirates' 9–5 victory over the San Francisco Giants at Candlestick Park. On April 30, 1996, he repeated this feat, this time in the fourth inning of the Pirates' 10–7 victory over the Cincinnati Reds at Cinergy Field. Alex Rodriguez and Edwin Encarnación would later accomplish this feat.

After the 1996 season, the Pirates traded King and Jay Bell to the Kansas City Royals for Joe Randa. In two full seasons with the Royals, he hit 28 and 24 home runs. King was the Royals regular first baseman at the beginning of the 1999 season, but, bothered by back problems, he abruptly announced his retirement on May 23, 1999, two days after going 1–4 against the Texas Rangers. Sportswriter Joe Posnanski, who covered King when Posnanski worked for the Kansas City Star, reported that King disliked baseball so much that he retired the day after his pension from Major League Baseball fully vested.

King finished his career with a .256 batting average and 154 home runs in 1,201 games.

Preceded by B. J. Surhoff	First overall pick in the MLB Entry Draft; 1986	Succeeded by Ken Griffey Jr.
Preceded by Frank Thomas	American League Player of the Month; June, 1997	Succeeded by Tim Salmon
