= Mike Coolbaugh Award =

Award in Minor League Baseball

- Sport: Baseball
- League: Minor League Baseball
- Awarded for: Outstanding baseball work ethic, knowledge of the game, and skill in mentoring young players on the field
- Country: United States; Canada
- Presented by: Minor League Baseball

History
- First winner: Bobby Jones (2008)
- Most recent: Pat Kelly (2025)

The Mike Coolbaugh Award is presented annually by Minor League Baseball to recognize "an individual who has shown an outstanding baseball work ethic, knowledge of the game, and skill in mentoring young players on the field." It is usually awarded during baseball's Winter Meetings. The award, first issued in 2008, is named in honor of Mike Coolbaugh, who died when he was struck by a line drive while coaching at first base during a Tulsa Drillers game in July 2007.

Two personnel from the Nashville Sounds have won the Mike Coolbaugh Award, more than any other team. Two members of the Cleveland Guardians, Kansas City Royals, and Milwaukee Brewers Major League Baseball (MLB) organizations have each won the award, more than any others.

== Winners ==
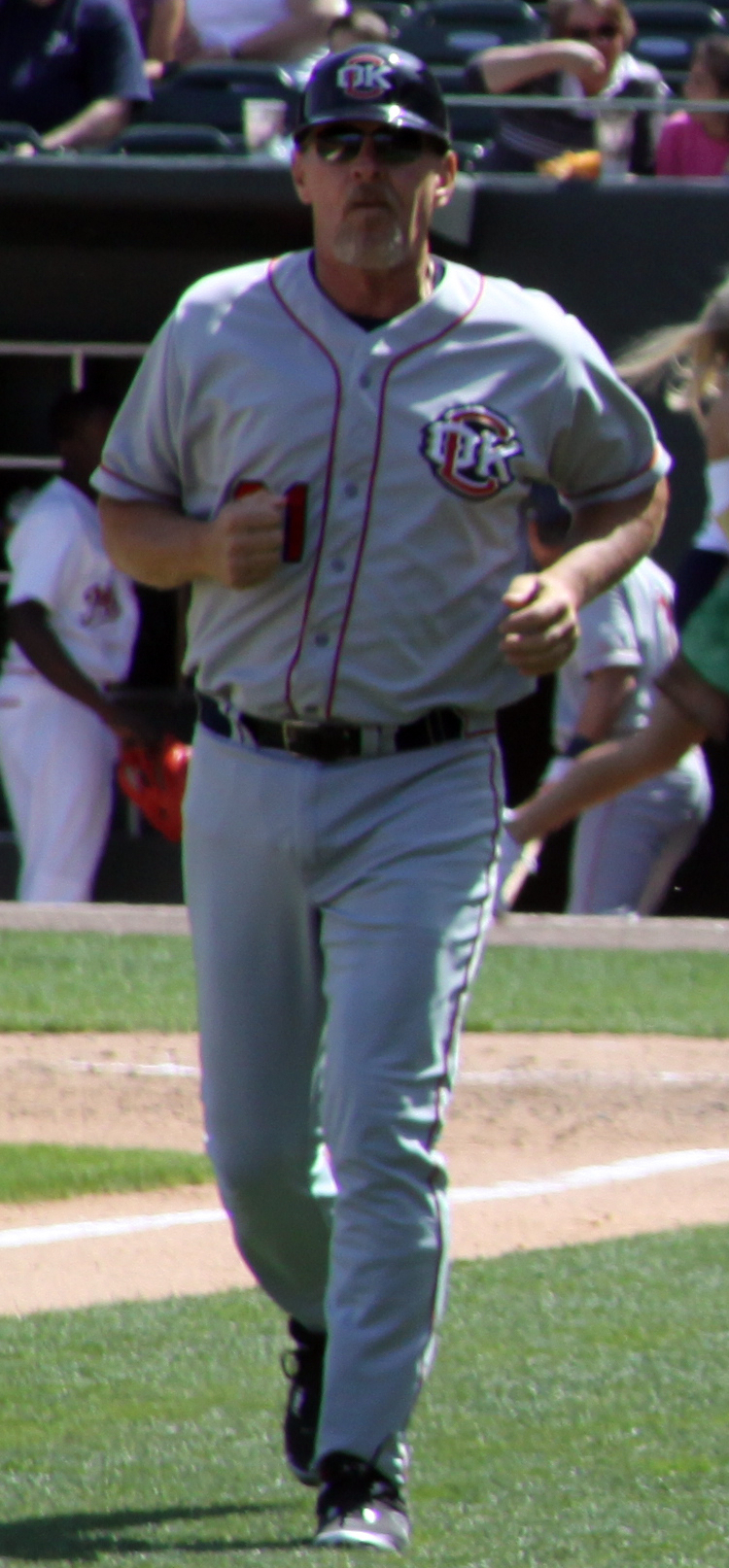
Bobby Jones won the first Mike Coolbaugh Award in 2008.

Winners
Year	Winner	Team	Organization	Position	Ref(s).
2008	Bobby Jones	Oklahoma City RedHawks	Texas Rangers	Manager	
2009	Charlie Montoyo	Durham Bulls	Tampa Bay Rays	Manager	
2010	Woody Huyke	Gulf Coast League Pirates	Pittsburgh Pirates	Coach	
2011	Mike Jirschele	Omaha Storm Chasers	Kansas City Royals	Manager	
2012	Johnny Goryl	—	Cleveland Indians	Advisor to Player Development	
2013	Mike Guerrero	Nashville Sounds	Milwaukee Brewers	Manager	
2014	Tom Wiedenbauer	—	Cleveland Indians	Minor League Field Coordinator	
2015	John Shoemaker	Ogden Raptors	Los Angeles Dodgers	Manager	
2016	Spin Williams	—	Washington Nationals	Senior Advisor of Player Development	
2017	Dennis Holmberg	Bluefield Blue Jays	Toronto Blue Jays	Manager	
2018	Steve Turco	—	St. Louis Cardinals	Roving instructor	
2019	Glenn Gregson	—	Boston Red Sox	Latin American Pitching Advisor	
2020	None selected (season cancelled due to COVID-19 pandemic)				
2021	Roly de Armas	Florida Complex League Phillies	Philadelphia Phillies	Manager	
2022	Rick Sweet	Nashville Sounds	Milwaukee Brewers	Manager	
2023	Bobby Cuellar	—	Los Angeles Dodgers	Special Assistant to Player Development	
2024	Chino Cadahia	—	Kansas City Royals	Special Assistant to General Manager/Player Development	
2025	Pat Kelly	Louisville Bats	Cincinnati Reds	Manager	
