= List of Major League Baseball single-inning home run leaders =

Baseball list

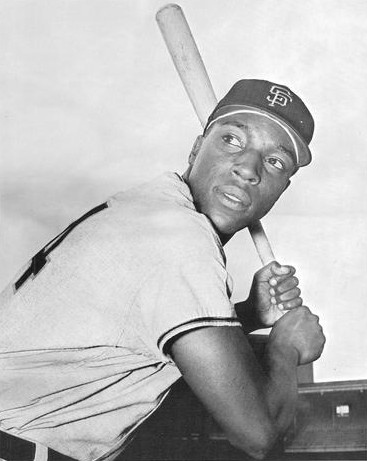
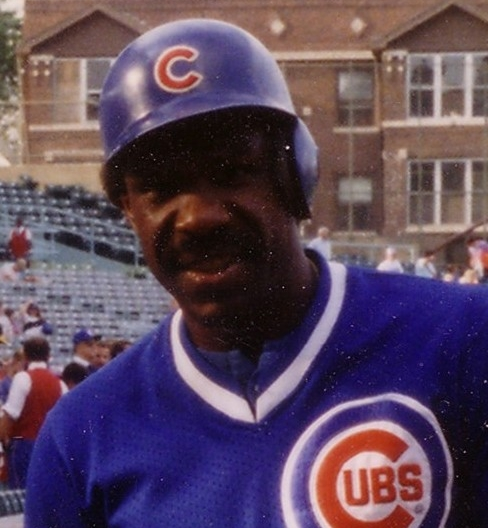
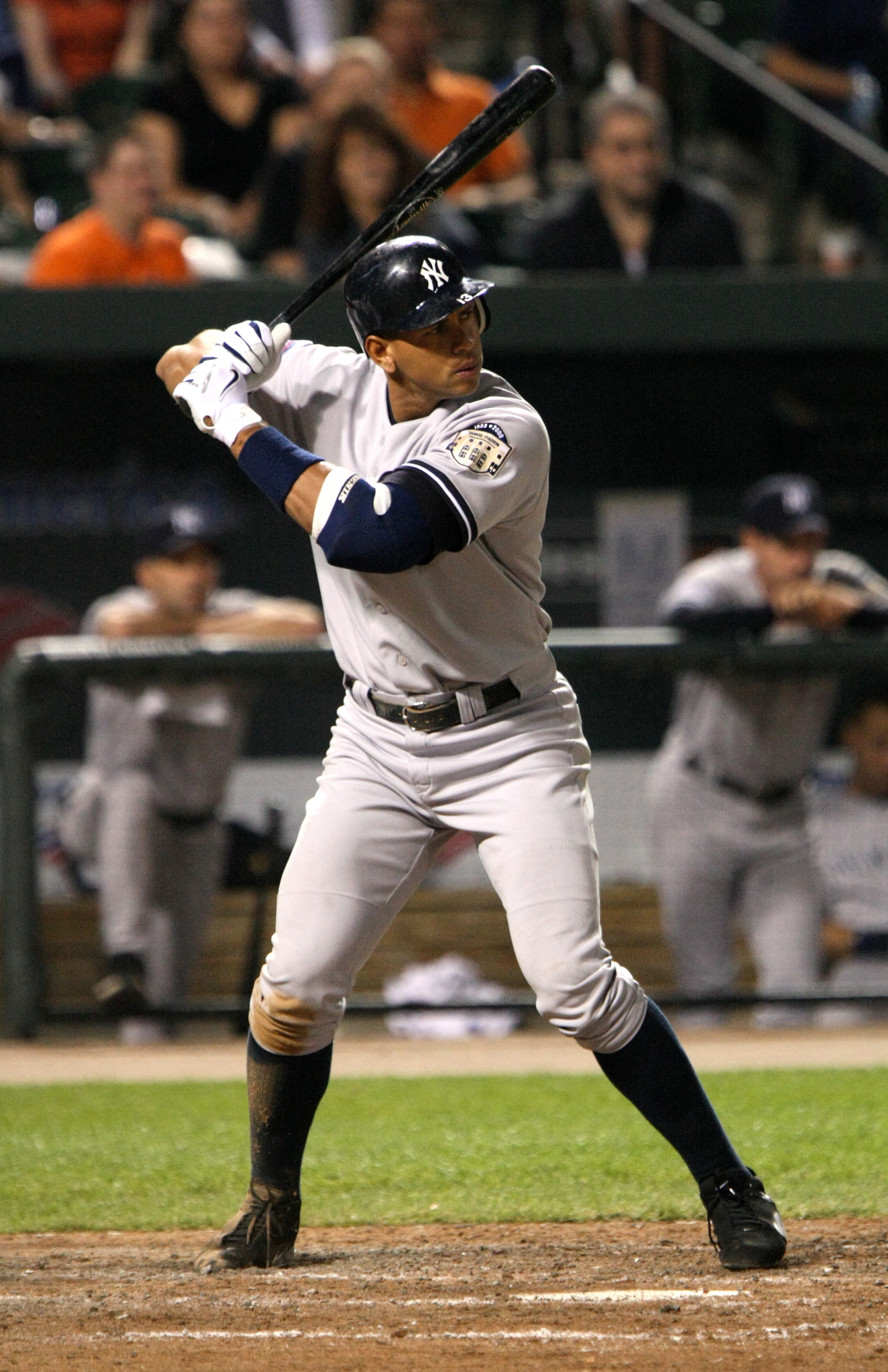
Willie McCovey (left), Andre Dawson (center), and Alex Rodriguez (right) are three of the only five players to hit two home runs in one inning on two separate occasions.

In baseball, a home run is credited to a batter when he hits a fair ball and reaches home safely on the same play, without the benefit of an error. Sixty-seven different players have hit two home runs in an inning of a Major League Baseball (MLB) game to date, the most recent being Austin Wells of The New York Yankees, on August 30,2026. Regarded as a notable achievement, five players have accomplished the feat more than once in their career; no player has ever hit more than two home runs in an inning. Charley Jones was the first player to hit two home runs in one inning, doing so for the Boston Red Stockings against the Buffalo Bisons on June 10, 1880.

These innings have resulted in other single-inning and single-game MLB records being set due to the prodigious offensive performance. Bobby Lowe and Mike Cameron finished their respective games with a total of four home runs, equaling the record for most home runs in one game. Both of the home runs hit by Fernando Tatís in the third inning for the St. Louis Cardinals on April 23, 1999, were grand slams. Not only did he tie the record for most grand slams in one game, Tatís became the only player to hit two grand slams in the same inning and established a new major league record with eight runs batted in (RBI) in a single inning. A decade later, Alex Rodriguez set the single-inning American League record for RBIs with seven when he hit a three-run home run and a grand slam in the sixth inning for the New York Yankees on October 4, 2009.

Bret Boone and Cameron are the only players to each hit two home runs in one inning on the same day (May 2, 2002), in the same game, in the same inning (the first), in a pair of back-to-back at bats, and as teammates (playing for the Seattle Mariners). Carlos Baerga, Mark Bellhorn, and Kendrys Morales hit their home runs from both sides of the plate. Jeff King is the sole player to accomplish the feat in consecutive seasons. Bill Regan has the fewest career home runs among players who have two home runs in one inning with 18, while Alex Rodriguez, with 696, hit more home runs than any other player in this group and amassed the fifth most in major league history. Willie McCovey, Mark McGwire, David Ortiz, Rodriguez, Gary Sheffield, and Sammy Sosa are also members of the 500 home run club.

Of the 45 players eligible for the Baseball Hall of Fame who have hit two home runs in an inning, eight have been elected, four on the first ballot. Players are eligible for the Hall of Fame if they have played in at least 10 MLB seasons, and have either been retired for five seasons or deceased for at least six months. These requirements leave three players ineligible who are active, three players ineligible who are living and have played in the past five seasons, and six players ineligible who did not play in 10 seasons.

== Players ==
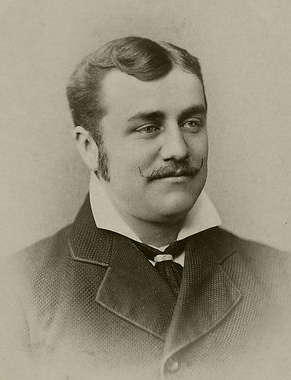
Charley Jones was the first player to hit two home runs in one inning.

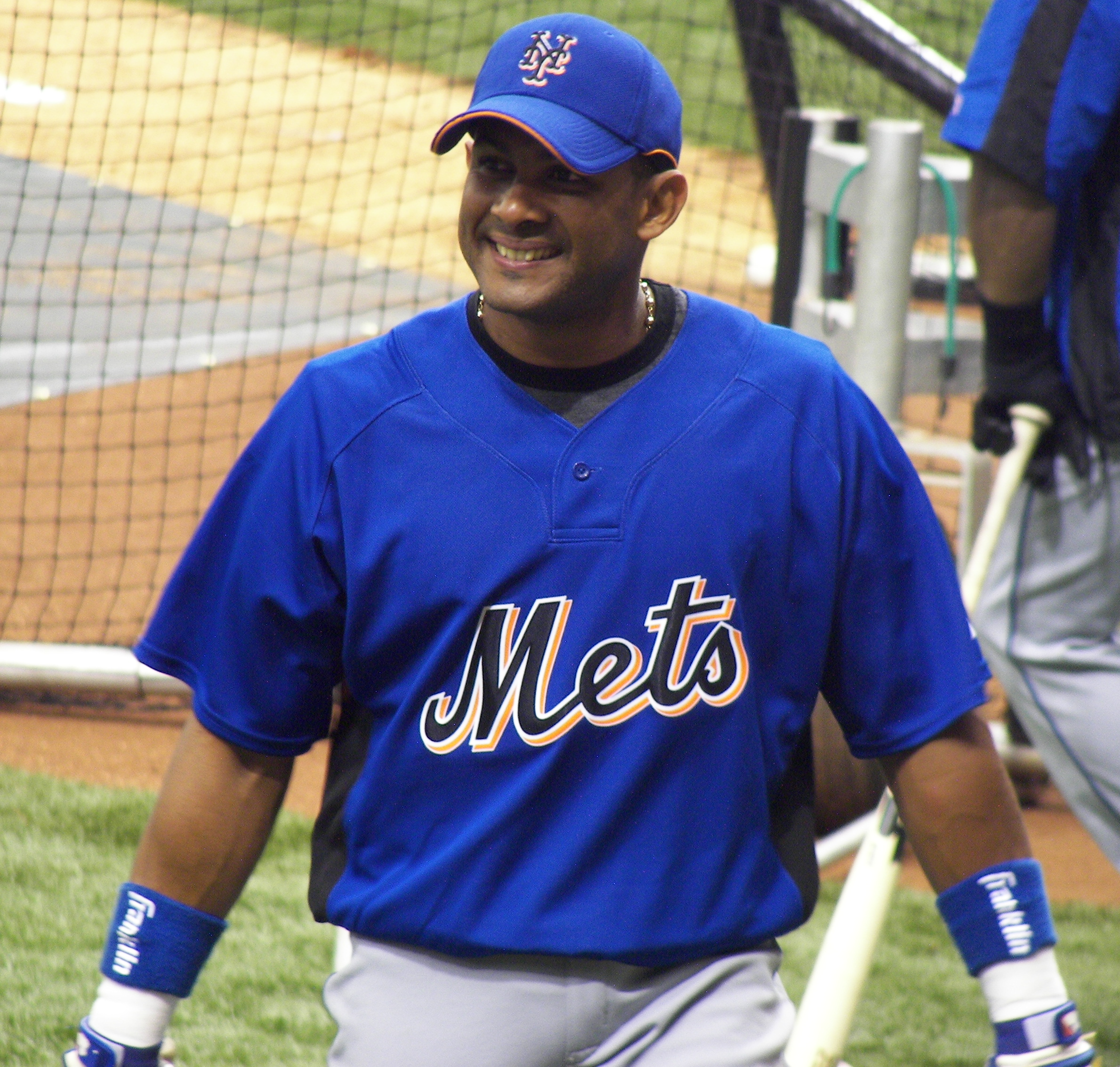
Both of Fernando Tatís' same-inning home runs were grand slams, making him the only player to attain that milestone and setting a new major league record of eight runs batted in in a single inning.

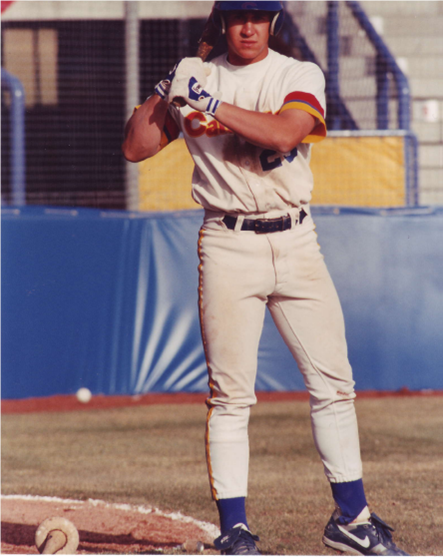
Bret Boone hit two home runs in the same inning as teammate Mike Cameron, becoming the only teammates to accomplish the feat.

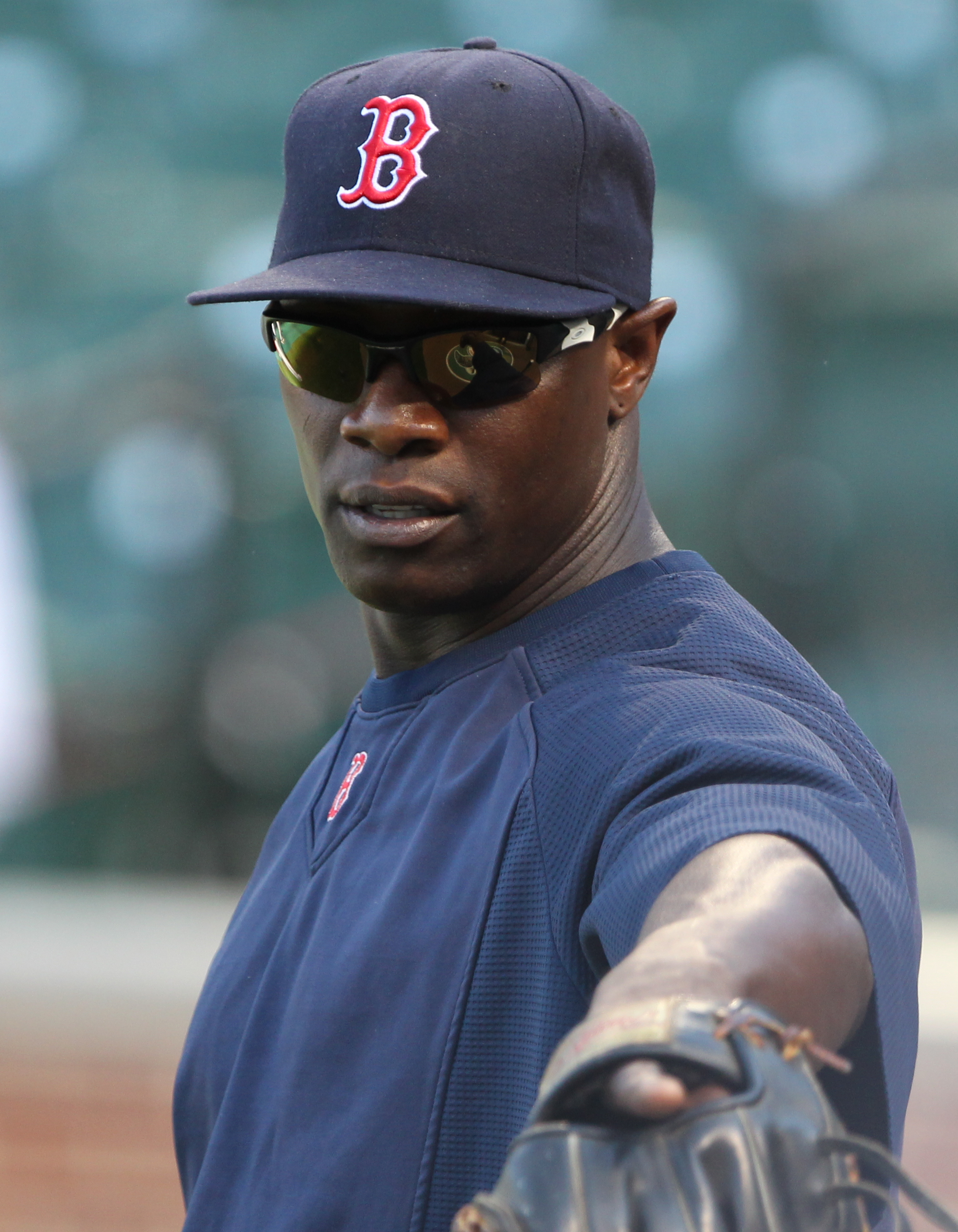
Mike Cameron also finished that game with a record-equaling four home runs.

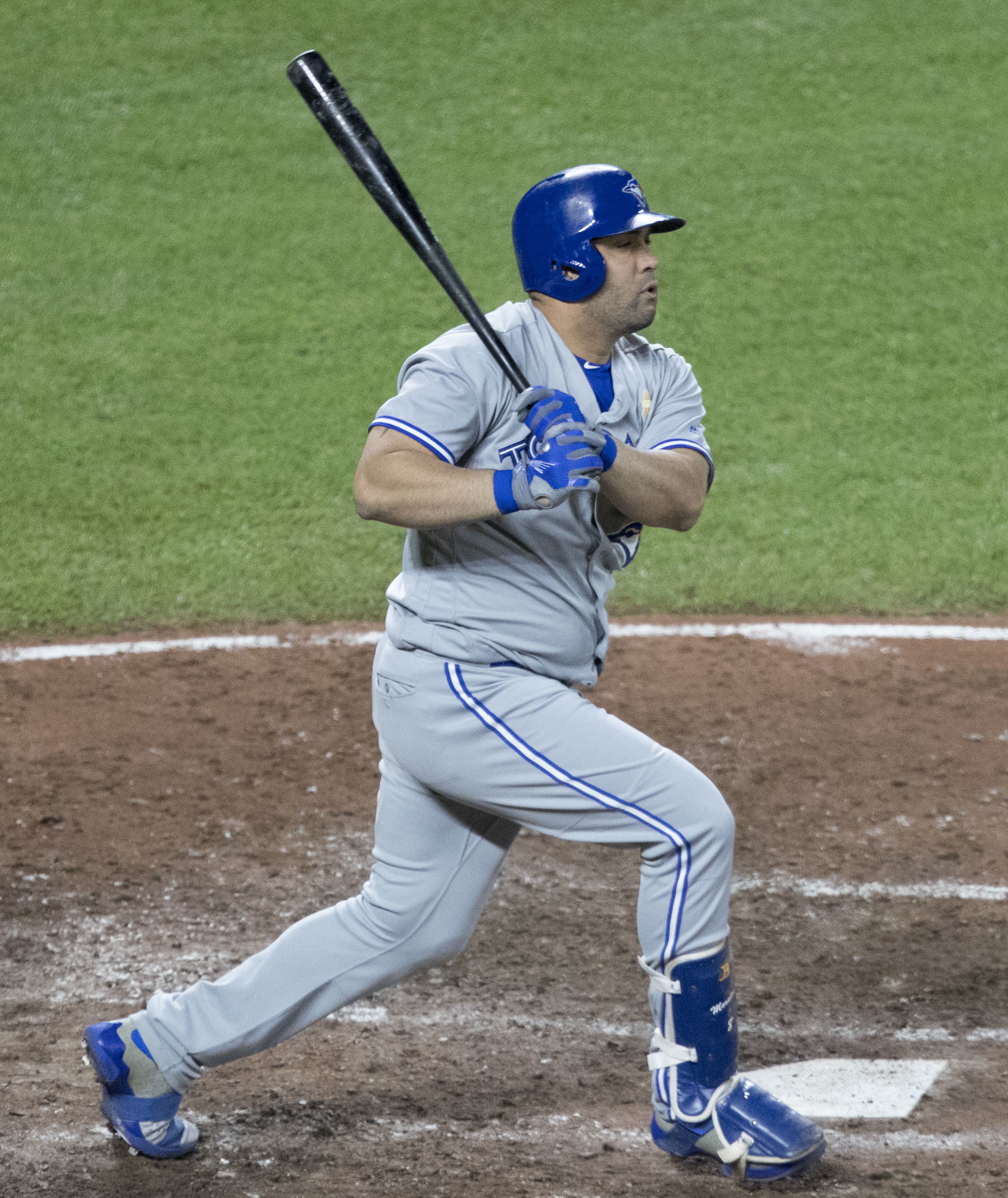
Kendrys Morales is one of three switch hitters to hit home runs from both sides of the plate in the same inning.

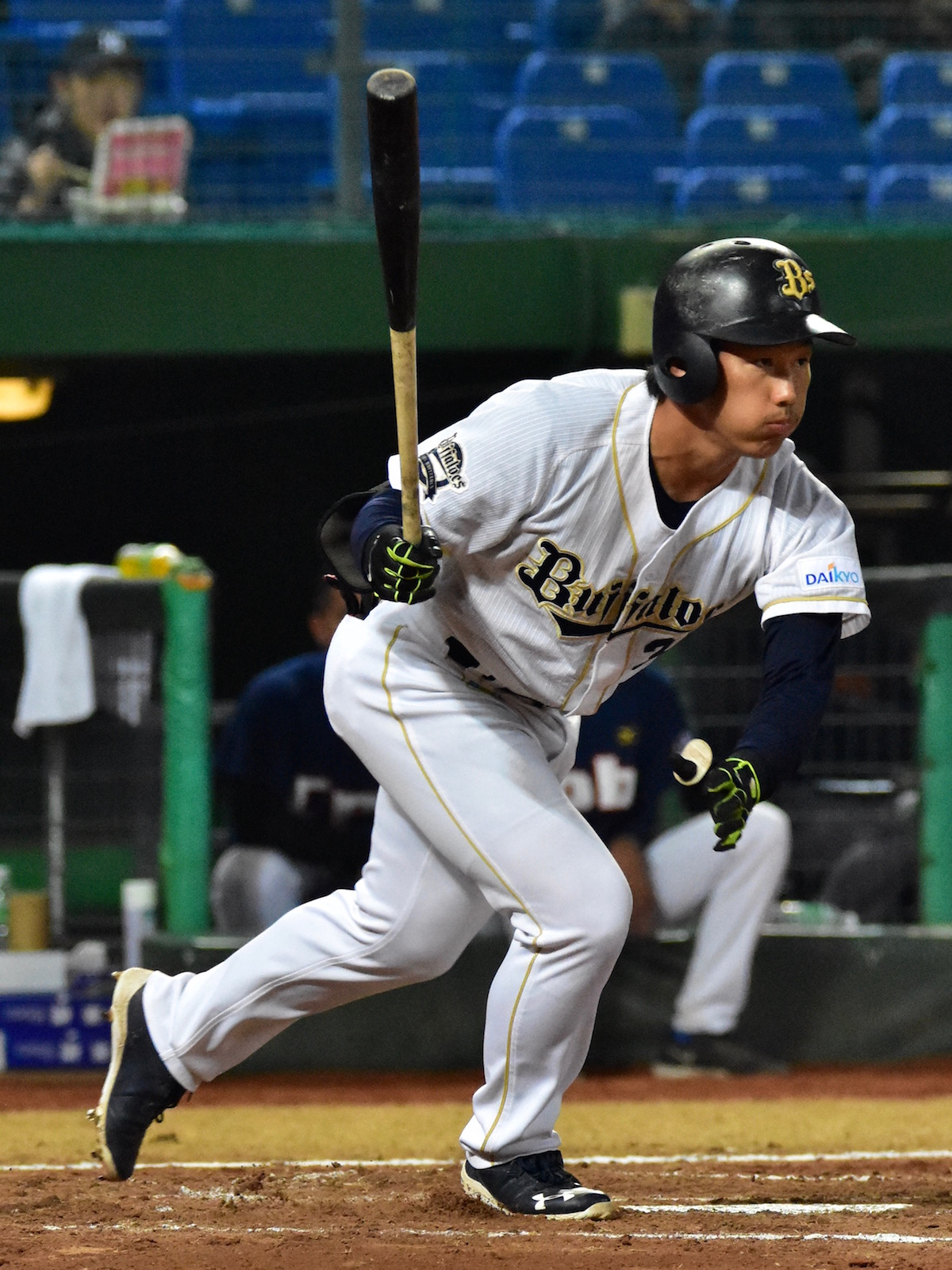
Masataka Yoshida hit two home runs in one inning on April 23, 2023

Key
| Player (X) | Name of the player and number of two homer innings they had at that point |
| Date | Date of the game |
| Team | The player's team at the time of the game |
| Opposing team | The team against whom the player hit two home runs in one inning |
| Inning | The inning in which the player hit two home runs |
| Career HR | The number of home runs the player hit in his MLB career |
| Box | Box score with play by play (if available) |
| & | Indicates game in which multiple players each hit two home runs in one inning |
| * | Indicates inning in which multiple players each hit two home runs |
| † | Elected to the Baseball Hall of Fame |
| ‡ | Player is active |

MLB hitters with two home runs in one inning
| Player | Date | Team | Opposing team | Inning | Career HR | Box | Ref |
|---|---|---|---|---|---|---|---|
| Charley Jones | June 10, 1880 | Boston Red Stockings | Buffalo Bisons | 8th | 56 | —N/a | |
| Lou Bierbauer | July 12, 1890 | Brooklyn Ward's Wonders | Buffalo Bisons | 3rd | 34 | —N/a | |
| Ed Cartwright | September 23, 1890 | St. Louis Browns | Philadelphia Athletics | 3rd | 24 | —N/a | |
| Bobby Lowe | May 30, 1894 | Boston Beaneaters | Cincinnati Reds | 3rd | 71 | —N/a | |
| Jake Stenzel | June 6, 1894 | Pittsburgh Pirates | Boston Beaneaters | 3rd | 32 | —N/a | |
| Ken Williams | August 7, 1922 | St. Louis Browns | Washington Senators | 6th | 196 | | |
| Hack Wilson^{†} | July 1, 1925 | New York Giants | Philadelphia Phillies | 3rd | 244 | | |
| Bill Regan | June 16, 1928 | Boston Red Sox | Chicago White Sox | 4th | 18 | | |
| Hank Leiber | August 24, 1935 | New York Giants | Chicago Cubs | 2nd | 101 | | |
| Joe DiMaggio^{†} | June 24, 1936 | New York Yankees | Chicago White Sox | 5th | 361 | | |
| Andy Seminick | June 2, 1949 | Philadelphia Phillies | Cincinnati Reds | 8th | 164 | | |
| Sid Gordon | July 31, 1949 | New York Giants | Cincinnati Reds | 2nd | 202 | | |
| Al Kaline^{†} | April 17, 1955 | Detroit Tigers | Kansas City Athletics | 6th | 399 | | |
| Jim Lemon | September 5, 1959 | Washington Senators | Boston Red Sox | 3rd | 164 | | |
| Joe Pepitone | May 23, 1962 | New York Yankees | Kansas City Athletics | 8th | 219 | | |
| Rick Reichardt | April 30, 1966 | California Angels | Boston Red Sox | 8th | 116 | | |
| Willie McCovey^{†} | April 12, 1973 | San Francisco Giants | Houston Astros | 4th | 521 | | |
| John Boccabella | July 6, 1973 | Montreal Expos | Houston Astros | 6th | 26 | | |
| Lee May | April 29, 1974 | Houston Astros | Chicago Cubs | 6th | 354 | | |
| Willie McCovey^{†} (2) | June 27, 1977 | San Francisco Giants | Cincinnati Reds | 6th | 521 | | |
| Cliff Johnson | June 30, 1977 | New York Yankees | Toronto Blue Jays | 8th | 196 | | |
| Andre Dawson^{†} | July 30, 1978 | Montreal Expos | Atlanta Braves | 3rd | 438 | | |
| Ray Knight | May 13, 1980 | Cincinnati Reds | New York Mets | 5th | 84 | | |
| Von Hayes | June 11, 1985 | Philadelphia Phillies | New York Mets | 1st | 143 | | |
| Andre Dawson^{†} (2) | September 24, 1985 | Montreal Expos | Chicago Cubs | 5th | 438 | | |
| Dale Murphy | July 27, 1989 | Atlanta Braves | San Francisco Giants | 6th | 398 | | |
| Ellis Burks | August 27, 1990 | Boston Red Sox | Cleveland Indians | 4th | 352 | | |
| Carlos Baerga | April 8, 1993 | Cleveland Indians | New York Yankees | 7th | 134 | | |
| Joe Carter | October 3, 1993 | Toronto Blue Jays | Baltimore Orioles | 2nd | 396 | | |
| Jeff Bagwell^{†} | June 24, 1994 | Houston Astros | Los Angeles Dodgers | 6th | 449 | | |
| Jeff King | August 8, 1995 | Pittsburgh Pirates | San Francisco Giants | 2nd | 154 | | |
| Jeff King (2) | April 30, 1996 | Pittsburgh Pirates | Cincinnati Reds | 4th | 154 | | |
| Sammy Sosa | May 16, 1996 | Chicago Cubs | Houston Astros | 7th | 609 | | |
| Dave Nilsson | May 17, 1996 | Milwaukee Brewers | Minnesota Twins | 6th | 105 | | |
| Mark McGwire | September 22, 1996 | Oakland Athletics | Seattle Mariners | 5th | 583 | | |
| Mike Lansing | May 7, 1997 | Montreal Expos | San Francisco Giants | 6th | 84 | | |
| Gary Sheffield | July 13, 1997 | Florida Marlins | Philadelphia Phillies | 4th | 509 | | |
| Fernando Tatís | April 23, 1999 | St. Louis Cardinals | Los Angeles Dodgers | 3rd | 113 | | |
| Eric Karros | August 22, 2000 | Los Angeles Dodgers | Montreal Expos | 6th | 284 | | |
| Bret Boone | May 2, 2002^{&} | Seattle Mariners | Chicago White Sox | 1st^{*} | 252 | | |
| Mike Cameron | May 2, 2002^{&} | Seattle Mariners | Chicago White Sox | 1st^{*} | 278 | | |
| Jared Sandberg | June 11, 2002 | Tampa Bay Devil Rays | Los Angeles Dodgers | 5th | 25 | | |
| Nomar Garciaparra | July 23, 2002 | Boston Red Sox | Tampa Bay Devil Rays | 3rd | 229 | | |
| Carl Everett | July 26, 2002 | Texas Rangers | Oakland Athletics | 7th | 202 | | |
| Aaron Boone | August 9, 2002 | Cincinnati Reds | San Diego Padres | 1st | 126 | | |
| Mark Bellhorn | August 29, 2002 | Chicago Cubs | Milwaukee Brewers | 4th | 69 | | |
| Reggie Sanders | August 20, 2003 | Pittsburgh Pirates | St. Louis Cardinals | 5th | 305 | | |
| Juan Rivera | June 19, 2004 | Montreal Expos | Chicago White Sox | 2nd | 132 | | |
| Julio Lugo | July 22, 2006 | Tampa Bay Devil Rays | Baltimore Orioles | 5th | 80 | | |
| Bengie Molina | May 7, 2007 | San Francisco Giants | New York Mets | 5th | 144 | | |
| Magglio Ordóñez | August 12, 2007 | Detroit Tigers | Oakland Athletics | 2nd | 294 | | |
| Alex Rodriguez | September 5, 2007 | New York Yankees | Seattle Mariners | 7th | 696 | | |
| Jim Edmonds | June 21, 2008 | Chicago Cubs | Chicago White Sox | 4th | 393 | | |
| David Ortiz^{†} | August 12, 2008 | Boston Red Sox | Texas Rangers | 1st | 541 | | |
| Michael Cuddyer | August 23, 2009 | Minnesota Twins | Kansas City Royals | 7th | 197 | | |
| Alex Rodriguez (2) | October 4, 2009 | New York Yankees | Tampa Bay Rays | 6th | 696 | | |
| Juan Uribe | September 23, 2010 | San Francisco Giants | Chicago Cubs | 2nd | 199 | | |
| Pablo Sandoval | September 18, 2011 | San Francisco Giants | Colorado Rockies | 4th | 153 | | |
| Kendrys Morales | July 30, 2012 | Los Angeles Angels | Texas Rangers | 6th | 213 | | |
| Adrián Beltré^{†} | August 22, 2012 | Texas Rangers | Baltimore Orioles | 4th | 477 | | |
| Edwin Encarnación | July 26, 2013 | Toronto Blue Jays | Houston Astros | 7th | 424 | | |
| Mark Trumbo | April 15, 2016 | Baltimore Orioles | Texas Rangers | 7th | 218 | | |
| Edwin Encarnación (2) | April 8, 2019 | Seattle Mariners | Kansas City Royals | 6th | 424 | | |
| Gleyber Torres^{‡} | September 21, 2022 | New York Yankees | Pittsburgh Pirates | 8th | 158 | | |
| Masataka Yoshida^{‡} | April 23, 2023 | Boston Red Sox | Milwaukee Brewers | 8th | 30 | | |
| Trea Turner^{‡} | August 19, 2023 | Philadelphia Phillies | Washington Nationals | 8th | 193 | | |
| Brent Rooker^{‡} | May 4, 2024 | Oakland Athletics | Miami Marlins | 3rd | 119 | | |
| Jo Adell^{‡} | April 10, 2025 | Los Angeles Angels | Tampa Bay Rays | 5th | 85 | | |
| Riley Greene^{‡} | May 2, 2025 | Detroit Tigers | Los Angeles Angels | 9th | 84 | | |
| Yordan Alvarez^{‡} | June 12, 2026 | Houston Astros | Kansas City Royals | 1st | 194 | | |
| Kyle Schwarber^{‡} | June 20, 2026 | Philadelphia Phillies | New York Mets | 3rd | 367 | | |
| Austin Wells^{‡} | August 30, 2026 | New York Yankees | Boston Red Sox | 8th | 48 | | |
