= Roly de Armas =

American baseball player and manager (born 1951)

- Catcher / Coach
- Born: December 29, 1951 (age 74); New York City, New York, U.S.
- Bats: Switch Throws: Right
- Stats at Baseball Reference

Teams
- As coach: Chicago White Sox (1995–1996); Toronto Blue Jays (2000); Philadelphia Phillies (2008)

Career highlights and awards
- World Series champion (2008)
Medals
Men's baseball
Representing the United States
Summer Olympics
Silver medal – second place	2020 Tokyo	Team

Rolando Jesús de Armas (born December 29, 1951) is an American professional baseball manager, most recently for the FCL Phillies of Minor League Baseball in 2021. A former catcher in the minor leagues, he spent all of his playing career and most of his managing career as a member of the Philadelphia Phillies' organization. He has also been a coach in Major League Baseball (MLB) for the Chicago White Sox (1995–1996) and Toronto Blue Jays (2000), and was interim bullpen coach for the 2008 Phillies championship team.

== Career ==
De Armas graduated from Archbishop Curley High School of Miami, Florida, attended Miami Dade North Junior College and graduated from Georgia Southern University. He played five seasons, 1973–1977, in the Phillies' farm system, peaking at the Double-A level with the Reading Phillies of the Eastern League. De Armas batted .259 with one home run in 311 games played.

De Armas began his managing career in 1979, and as of 2018 he was still managing in the Philadelphia farm system with the GCL Phillies of the Rookie-level Gulf Coast League, his 33rd season as a minor-league skipper.

In August 2019, de Armas was named a coach for the United States national baseball team for the 2019 WBSC Premier12 tournament. The team finished fourth in the tournament, failing to qualify for the 2020 Olympics. In April 2021, he was again named a national team coach, for the team's final efforts to qualify for baseball at the 2020 Summer Olympics, held in 2021 in Tokyo. The team qualified, with de Armas serving as bullpen coach for the Olympics. The team went on to win silver, falling to Japan in the gold-medal game.

De Armas won the 2021 Mike Coolbaugh Award for his "outstanding baseball work ethic, knowledge of the game, and skill in mentoring young players on the field."

Sporting positions
Preceded by Dewey Robinson	Chicago White Sox bullpen coach 1995–1996	Succeeded by Art Kusnyer
Preceded by Marty Pevey	Toronto Blue Jays bullpen coach 2000	Succeeded by Gil Patterson
