= Jared Sandberg =

American baseball player & coach (born 1978)

- Third baseman
- Born: March 2, 1978 (age 48); Olympia, Washington, U.S.
- Batted: Right Threw: Right

MLB debut
- August 7, 2001, for the Tampa Bay Devil Rays

Last MLB appearance
- September 26, 2003, for the Tampa Bay Devil Rays

MLB statistics
- Batting average: .221
- Home runs: 25
- Runs batted in: 92
- Stats at Baseball Reference

Teams
- As player: Tampa Bay Devil Rays (2001–2003); As coach: Seattle Mariners (2019–2021)

Jared Lawrence Sandberg (born March 2, 1978) is an American professional baseball coach and a former Major League Baseball (MLB) third baseman and minor league manager. Sandberg served as the manager for Triple-A El Paso Chihuahuas in the PCL for the 2022 season.

He became the major league field coordinator for the Seattle Mariners of the American League prior to the 2019 season.

Born in Olympia, Washington, where he graduated from Capital High School, Sandberg had a 12-year pro playing career (1996–2007), and prior to joining the Mariners, he had spent 20 years in the Tampa Bay Rays' organization. His entire MLB career—196 games played—was spent with the team (then called the Devil Rays) from 2001 through 2003. He spent ten years as a manager in the Rays' farm system, including 2015 through 2018 as the pilot of the Triple-A Durham Bulls, their top affiliate, where he won consecutive International League Governors' Cup championships in 2017–18.

== Career ==
Sandberg threw and batted right-handed, and was listed as 6 feet 3 inches (1.91 m) tall and 185 pounds (84 kg). During his MLB career, he collected 139 hits, with 38 doubles and 25 home runs. In 2002, Sandberg showed potential to hit for power, hitting 18 home runs in 102 games with the Devil Rays. On June 11, Sandberg hit two home runs in the fifth inning against the Los Angeles Dodgers, becoming the first player in Devil Rays history to hit two home runs in an inning and the first player to do so in an interleague game. However, he struck out 139 times that season, and his difficulties hitting for average prevented him from spending a full season in the major leagues. His career batting average was only .221.

In 2005, Sandberg played with the Portland Sea Dogs, a Double-A affiliate of the Boston Red Sox. Sandberg started the 2006 season with the Houston Astros Double-A affiliate Corpus Christi Hooks. He played mainly third base, but struggled to hit for average. In his final game for the Hooks, he broke out of an 0-for-26 slump with a home run. The following day, he was released to make room for a player to come off the disabled list. Sandberg signed with the Cleveland Indians and was assigned to the Double-A Akron Aeros. In 2007, Sandberg signed with the Kansas City Royals, and was assigned to play for the Double-A Wichita Wranglers.

He retired after the 2007 season and took a job as the hitting coach for the Single-A Hudson Valley Renegades in the Tampa Bay Rays organization. After the 2008 season, he became the manager of the Rookie level Princeton Rays. In the 2013 season, he became the manager of the Single-A Bowling Green Hot Rods in the Tampa Rays organization. He was named the manager of the High-A Charlotte Stone Crabs for the 2014 season. Following the departure of Charlie Montoyo, Sandberg was named manager of the Triple-A Durham Bulls in January 2015. On July 29, 2016, Sandberg was named the manager of the Arizona Fall League's Peoria Javelinas for the 2016 season.

His career minor-league managerial record (2009 through 2018) was 612–522 (.540).

On Wednesday November 21, 2018, the Seattle Mariners announced Sandberg had been hired to serve as their Major League field coordinator for the 2019 season.

== Personal life ==
Sandberg is the nephew of the Baseball Hall of Fame former Chicago Cubs second baseman Ryne Sandberg.

Preceded by Charlie Montoyo	Durham Bulls manager 2015–2018	Succeeded by Brady Williams
