= Bobby Jones (outfielder) =

American baseball player and coach (born 1949)

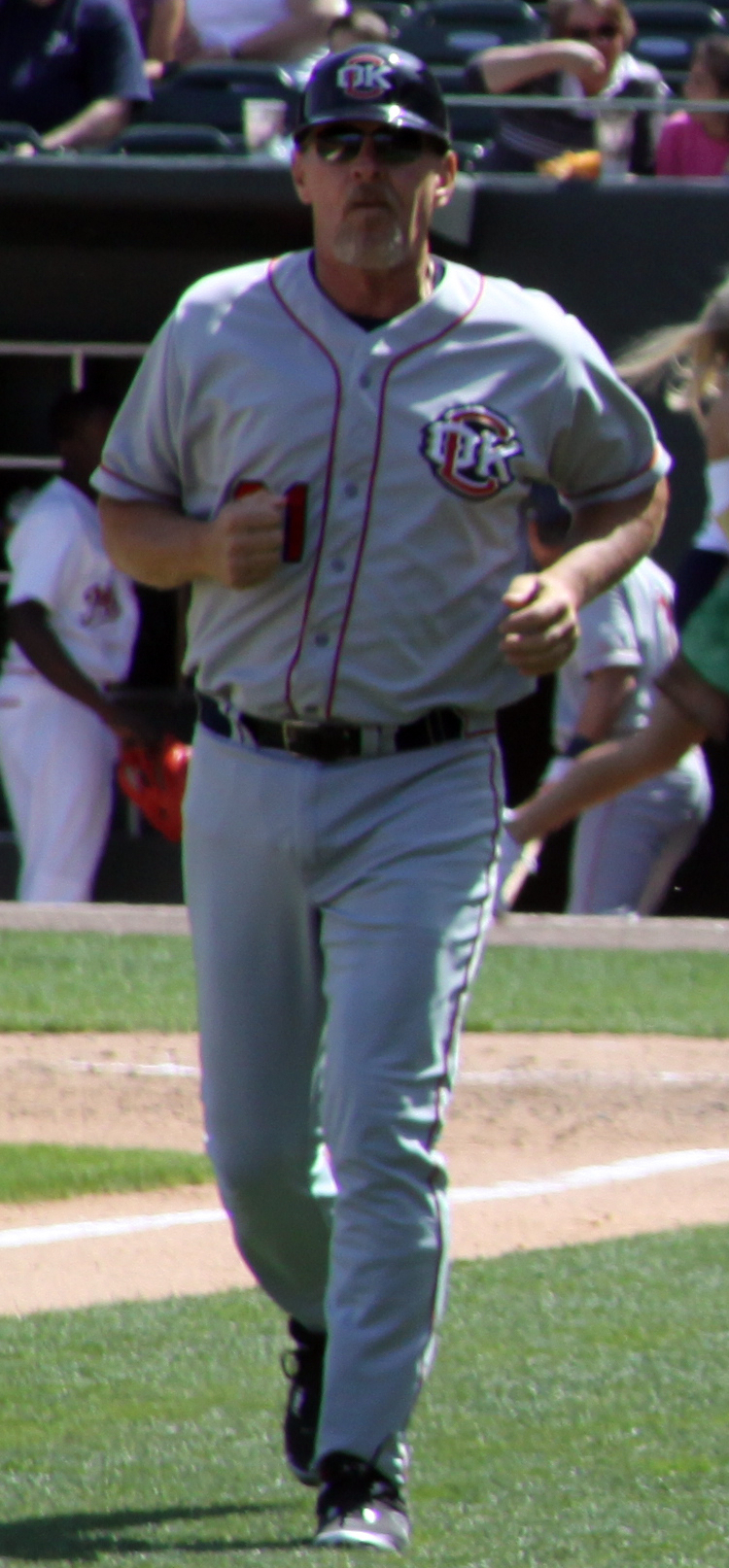
- Jones as manager of the Oklahoma City RedHawks in 2010
- Outfielder
- Born: October 11, 1949 (age 76); Elkton, Maryland, U.S.
- Batted: Left Threw: Left

MLB debut
- October 1, 1974, for the Texas Rangers

Last MLB appearance
- July 5, 1986, for the Texas Rangers

MLB statistics
- Batting average: .221
- Home runs: 20
- Runs batted in: 86

NPB statistics
- Batting average: .284
- Home runs: 20
- Runs batted in: 75
- Stats at Baseball Reference

Teams
- As player: Texas Rangers (1974–1975); California Angels (1976–1977); Chunichi Dragons (1979–1980); Texas Rangers (1981, 1983–1986); As coach: Texas Rangers (2000–2001, 2006, 2014–2015)

Robert Oliver Jones (born October 11, 1949) is an American former professional baseball outfielder, coach, and U.S. Army soldier during the Vietnam War. He played all or part of nine seasons in the majors from 1974 until 1986. He also played two seasons in Japan for the Chunichi Dragons in 1979 and 1980. In November 2013, Bobby Jones became a coach for the Texas Rangers.

== Early life ==
Jones graduated from Elkton High School where he starred on the varsity baseball team that won 26 consecutive games spread over two seasons in 1966 and 1967.

== Playing career ==
Jones was drafted by the Washington Senators in the 36th round of the 1967 Major League Baseball draft. He spent the next seven seasons with the organization, during which time they became the Texas Rangers, and debuted in the major leagues with them. During the 1976 season, the Rangers waived him, and he was claimed by the California Angels, for whom he played two seasons. He was released by the Angels before the 1979 season, and he signed with the Chunichi Dragons, for whom he played two seasons as well. He returned to the Rangers in 1981, and finished his major league career with them in 1986.

== Coaching/managerial career ==
Since his retirement, Jones has continued to be employed within the Rangers organization. His managing career began in 1988 with the Charlotte Rangers. He managed the team to the Florida State League championship in 1989. He also won a league championship with the Tulsa Drillers (1998). Other than 2001 and 2006, when he was a coach for the big-league club, Jones has managed at some level of the Rangers' farm system. In 2008, he managed the Triple-A Oklahoma City RedHawks.

Jones is the 89ers/RedHawks franchise's winningest manager (568 wins through 2008) and is the Rangers' all-time minor league leader with 1,285 victories (through 2008). He led the RedHawks to the division title in 2002, 2004, 2005, and 2008, and the American Conference title in 2008. He was also presented the 2008 Mike Coolbaugh Award for "outstanding baseball work ethic, knowledge of the game, and skill in mentoring young players on the field."

== Military career ==
Jones is one of the few baseball players who served on active duty in the United States Army in the Vietnam Era. He was stationed in Vietnam at Firebase Siberia From December 1969 to February 1971. He attained the rank of Sergeant and was section chief of a M102 howitzer group which was constantly under fire. He sustained permanent hearing loss in his right ear as a result of his tour of duty. He earned in February 1971 the Bronze Star Medal which was officially presented to him by a senior military officer in a pregame Patriot Day ceremony on September 11, 2014, at Globe Life Park while he served as Assistant Hitting Coach with the Texas Rangers.
