= Charlie Montoyo =

Puerto Rican baseball player and manager (born 1965)

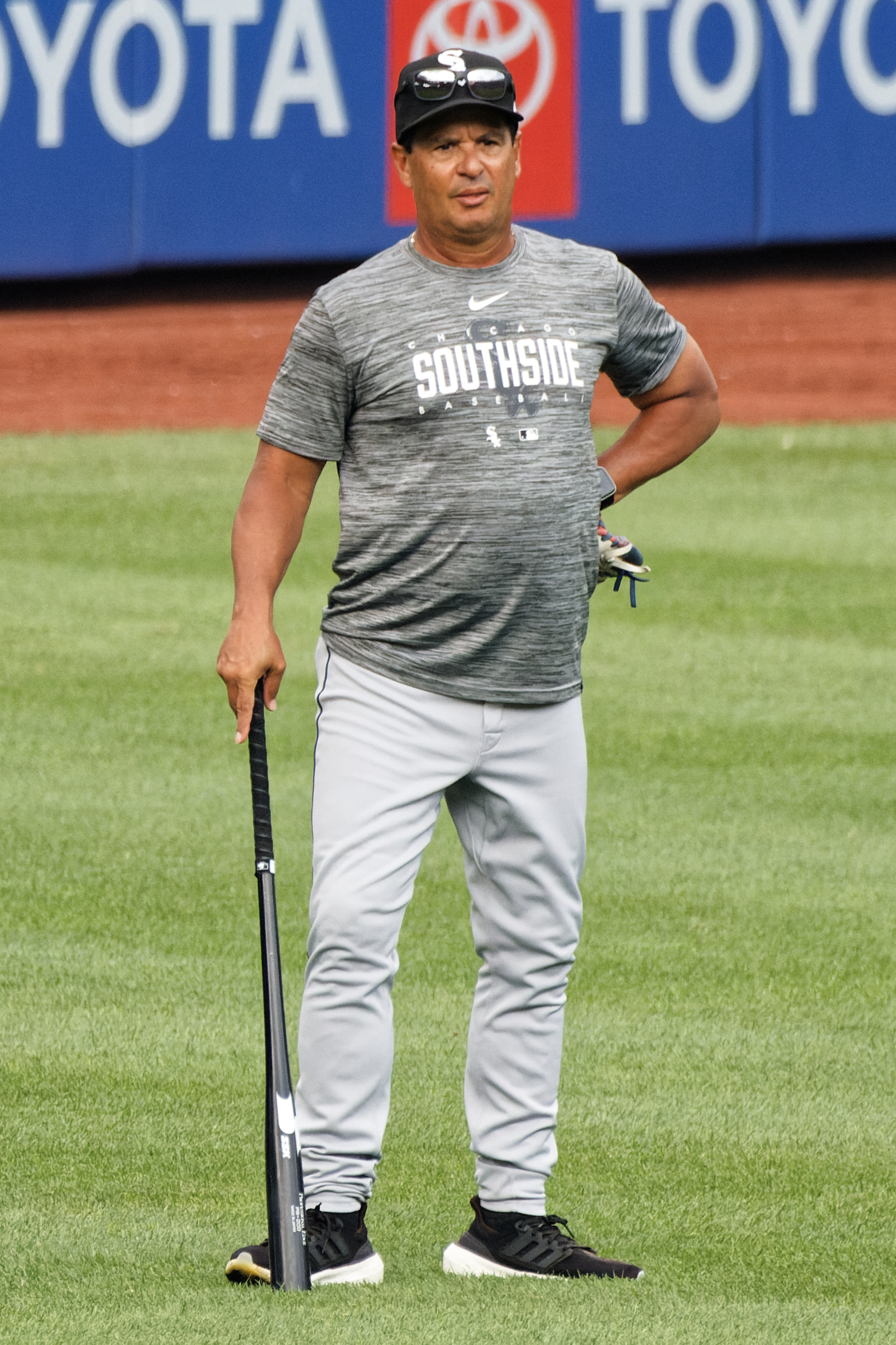
- Montoyo with the White Sox in 2023
- Second baseman / Manager
- Born: October 17, 1965 (age 60); Florida, Puerto Rico
- Batted: Right Threw: Right

MLB debut
- September 7, 1993, for the Montreal Expos

Last MLB appearance
- September 29, 1993, for the Montreal Expos

MLB statistics
- Batting average: .400
- Home runs: 0
- Runs batted in: 3
- Managerial record: 236–236
- Winning %: .500
- Stats at Baseball Reference
- Managerial record at Baseball Reference

Teams
- As player: Montreal Expos (1993); As manager: Toronto Blue Jays (2019–2022); As coach: Tampa Bay Rays (2015–2018); Chicago White Sox (2023–2024)

José Carlos Montoyo Díaz (born October 17, 1965) is a Puerto Rican former professional baseball second baseman, manager and coach. He played in Major League Baseball (MLB) for the Montreal Expos, managed the Toronto Blue Jays and coached for the Tampa Bay Rays and Chicago White Sox.

After eight seasons as manager of the minor league Durham Bulls, the Triple-A affiliate of the Tampa Bay Rays (2007–2014), Montoyo was among the candidates for the Rays' 2015 vacant managerial position and was ultimately hired as the team's third base coach. After the 2017 season, he became the Rays’ bench coach. On October 25, 2018, Montoyo was hired by the Toronto Blue Jays as their new manager, replacing John Gibbons. On July 13, 2022, Montoyo was fired by the Blue Jays. On November 3, 2022, Montoyo was named bench coach of the Chicago White Sox.

== Playing career ==
Montoyo threw and batted right-handed. During his playing days, he stood 5 feet 10 inches (1.78 m) tall, weighing 170 pounds (77 kg). Montoyo appeared in four games for the Montreal Expos, during the 1993 season, as a second baseman and pinch hitter.

After playing college baseball at Louisiana Tech University, Montoyo was drafted by the Milwaukee Brewers in the sixth round of the 1987 amateur draft, and then traded to Montreal on January 20, 1993. During his brief MLB career, that September, he singled in his first big-league at bat off Gary Wayne of the Colorado Rockies. All told, Montoyo had two hits in five at bats, with three runs batted in (RBI).

Montoyo played in 1,028 minor league games and retired at the end of the 1996 season. In ten years in the minors, he batted .266, with 38 home runs, and 400 RBI.

== Managing career ==
=== Tampa Bay organization ===
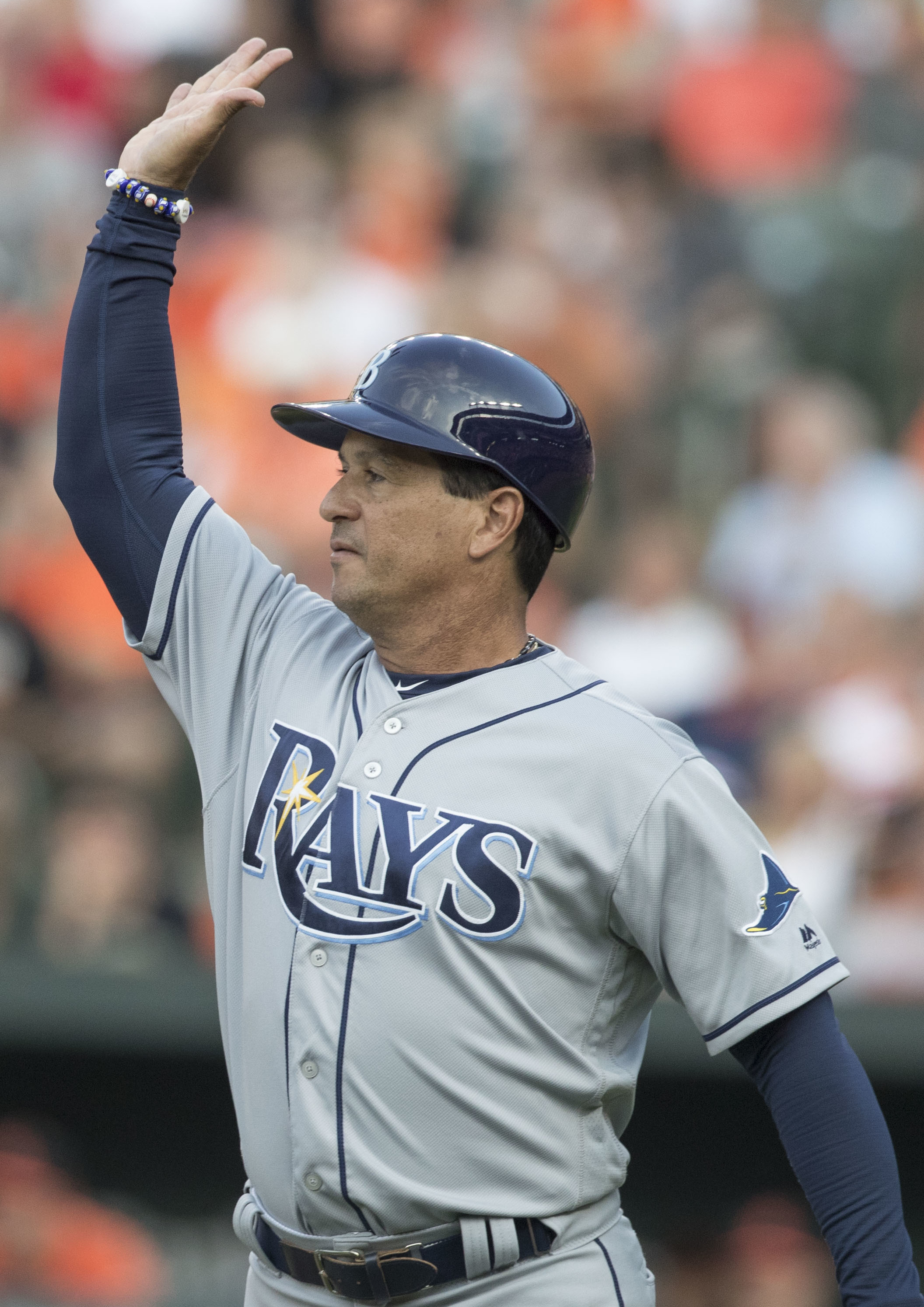
Montoyo with the Rays in 2017

In 1997, Montoyo joined the Tampa Bay Devil Rays' organization – the year before the expansion team played its first Major League game – as manager of the Rookie-level Princeton Devil Rays.

After leading Princeton to a 39–30 win–loss record in 1997, Montoyo managed the 1998 Short Season-A Hudson Valley Renegades, where he won his first division title. In 1999–2000, he managed the Charleston RiverDogs, leading them to their first winning season. He then was the pilot of the Bakersfield Blaze of the High Class A California League in 2001–2002. For the next four years, he served as the manager of Tampa Bay's Double-A clubs, the Orlando Rays (2003) and Montgomery Biscuits (2004–2006), where he won the Southern League championship in 2006.

In 2007, Montoyo became manager of Tampa Bay's top farm team, the Durham Bulls. Under his leadership, Durham had only one losing season and exceeded 80 wins five times in his first seven years. In 2010, the Bulls set a franchise Triple-A record for wins with 92. In both 2009 and 2013, they won the Governors' Cup, emblematic of the championship of the International League. Through 2015, his career minor-league managing record was 1,341–1,211 (.525).

Montoyo was a coach for the Puerto Rican 2009 World Baseball Classic team. Also, he was selected to serve as a coach for World Team in the 2010 and 2011 All-Star Futures Game.

He won the 2009 Mike Coolbaugh Award and 2010 and 2013 International League Manager of the Year Award.

On July 21, 2014, Montoyo surpassed Bill Evers as the Bulls' all-time winningest manager with his 614th victory at the helm of the Rays' Triple-A affiliate. At the time of his promotion to the Rays, Montoyo had notched 633 wins in a Bulls' uniform.

On October 19, 2015, Montoyo interviewed for the Seattle Mariners vacant managerial position.

On October 24, 2015, the Rays hired Matt Quatraro as their new third base coach and Montoyo became the bench coach, replacing Tom Foley.

=== Toronto Blue Jays ===
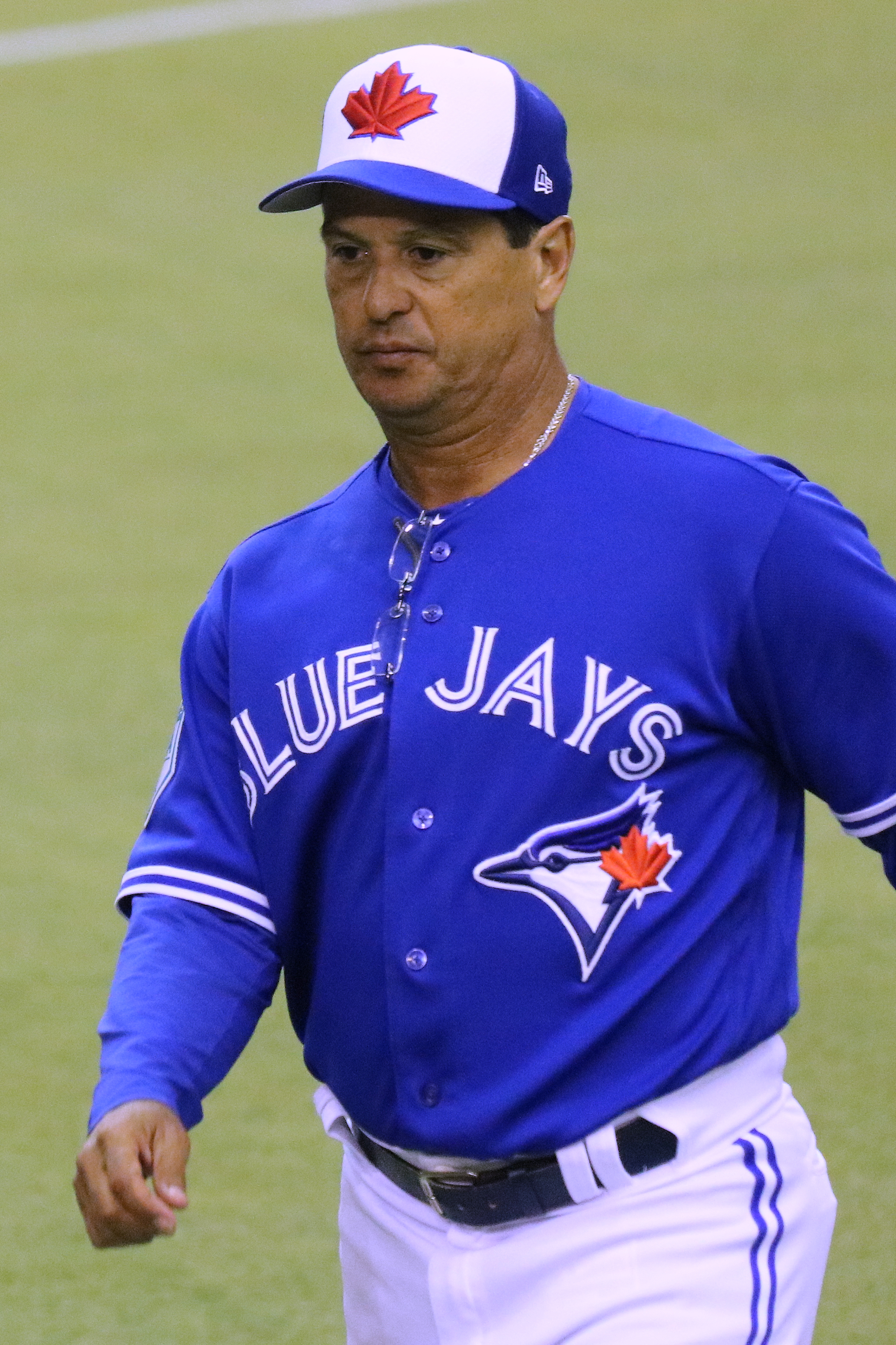
Montoyo as manager of the Blue Jays in 2019

On October 25, 2018, Montoyo was hired as the manager of the Toronto Blue Jays for the 2019 season. He signed a three-year contract, with a club option for a fourth year. He finished his first season with a record of 67 wins and 95 losses.

After guiding the Blue Jays to the playoffs in the 2020 season, Montoyo was nominated for AL Manager of the Year award along with Kevin Cash of the Tampa Bay Rays and Rick Renteria of the Chicago White Sox.

On March 16, 2021, the Blue Jays exercised the fourth-year option on Montoyo's contract, tying him to the team through the 2022 season. On April 1, 2022, Montoyo signed a contract extension through the 2023 season, and included team options for 2024 and 2025. Montoyo was fired on July 13 after a 2–9 stretch, despite the team sitting in the third wild card spot.

=== Chicago White Sox ===
On November 3, 2022, Montoyo was named the bench coach of the Chicago White Sox, under new manager Pedro Grifol.

On August 8, 2024, Montoyo was fired by the White Sox.

=== Managerial record ===
Team	Year	Regular season					Postseason			
Team	Year	Games	Won	Lost	Win %	Finish	Won	Lost	Win %	Result
TOR	2019	162	67	95	.414	4th in AL East	–	–	–	
TOR	2020	60	32	28	.533	3rd in AL East	0	2	.000	Lost ALWC (TB)
TOR	2021	162	91	71	.562	4th in AL East	–	–	–	
TOR	2022	88	46	42	.523	Fired	–	–	–	
Total		472	236	236	.500		0	2	.000	

== Championships ==
Montgomery Biscuits

- Southern League (2006)

Durham Bulls

- 6 Division Championships (2007, 2008, 2009, 2010, 2011, and 2013)
- 2 International League Championship (2009 and 2013)
  - The Bulls were Runners-up to the then-Richmond Braves, Scranton/Wilkes-Barre, and Columbus Clippers in 2007, 2008, and 2010 respectively
- Triple-A Baseball National Championship (2009)

== Personal life ==
Montoyo has a wife, Samantha, with whom he has two children.

== See also ==
- List of Major League Baseball players from Puerto Rico

Sporting positions
Preceded by Mako Oliveras	Orlando Rays manager 2003	Succeeded by Franchise relocated
Preceded by Franchise established	Montgomery Biscuits manager 2004–2006	Succeeded by Billy Gardner Jr.
Preceded by John Tamargo	Durham Bulls manager 2007–2014	Succeeded by Jared Sandberg
Preceded by Tom Foley	Tampa Bay Rays third base coach 2015–2017	Succeeded by Matt Quatraro
Preceded by Tom Foley	Tampa Bay Rays bench coach 2018	Succeeded by Matt Quatraro
Preceded by John Gibbons	Toronto Blue Jays manager 2019–2022	Succeeded by John Schneider (interim)
