= Mike Jirschele =

American baseball player and coach (born 1959)

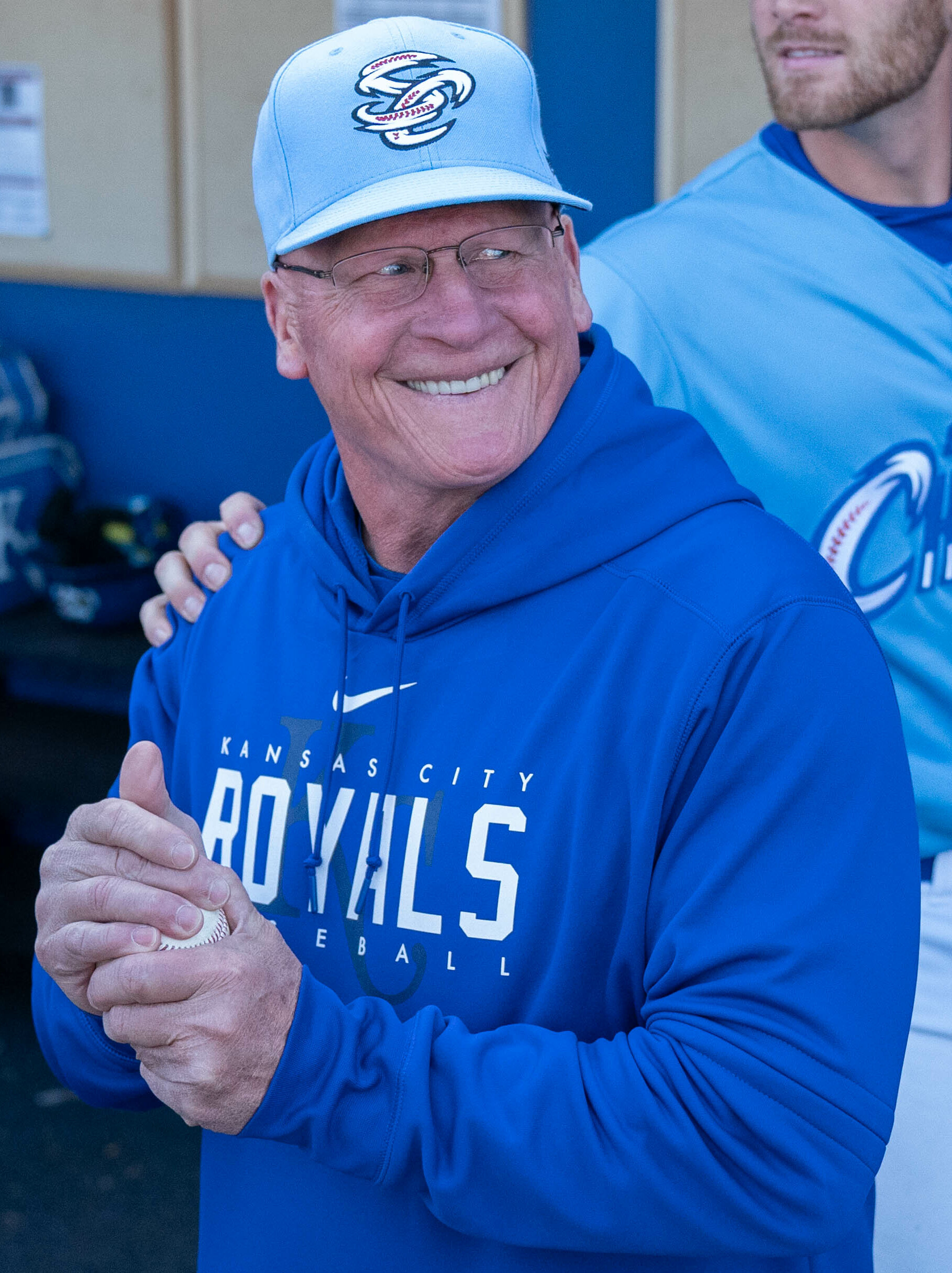
- Jirschele as manager of the Omaha Storm Chasers in 2023
- Coach
- Born: March 3, 1959 (age 67); Clintonville, Wisconsin, U.S.
- Bats: Right Throws: Right
- Stats at Baseball Reference

Teams
- As coach: Kansas City Royals (2014–2019)

Career highlights and awards
- World Series champion (2015)

Michael John Jirschele (/ˈdʒɜːrʃəli/; born March 3, 1959) is an American former professional baseball coach. He was manager of the Omaha Storm Chasers, the Triple-A minor league affiliate of Major League Baseball’s Kansas City Royals, from 1995 to 1997, 2003 to 2013, and 2023 to 2025. He was also the Royals third base coach from 2014 to 2019. Before his coaching career, he played minor league baseball for 13 seasons.

== Playing career ==
Jirschele went to high school in Clintonville, Wisconsin. He was named an all-state quarterback in football. He was recruited to play college football for the University of Wisconsin Badgers, but was drafted in the fifth round of the 1977 Major League Baseball draft and signed with the Texas Rangers organization.

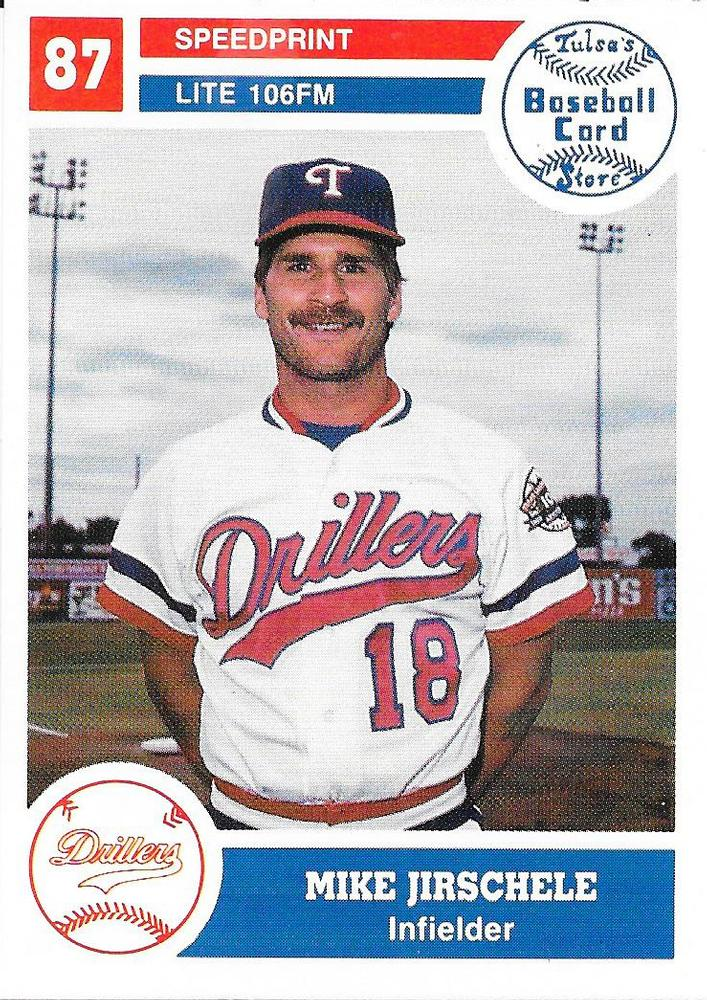
A 1987 baseball card of Jirschele with the Tulsa Drillers

An infielder, Jirschele played minor league baseball from 1977 through 1985 and from 1987 to 1990, hitting .225 with 102 doubles, 31 triples and 35 home runs in 999 games. He played at the Triple-A level for six seasons but never reached the major leagues.

== Manager and coach ==
Jirschele began his minor league managing career in 1992, heading the GCL Royals in the Gulf Coast League and leading them to the league championship. In 1993, he managed the Rockford Royals of the Midwest League, and in 1994 he managed the Wilmington Blue Rocks of the Carolina League, leading them to the league championship. From 1995 to 1997 and from 2003 to 2011 he managed the Omaha Storm Chasers, which was nicknamed the Omaha Royals prior to the 2011 season.

On May 23, 2011, Jirschele won his 1,000th game as a minor league manager. Later that year he won the Mike Coolbaugh Award as the minor league manager of the year.

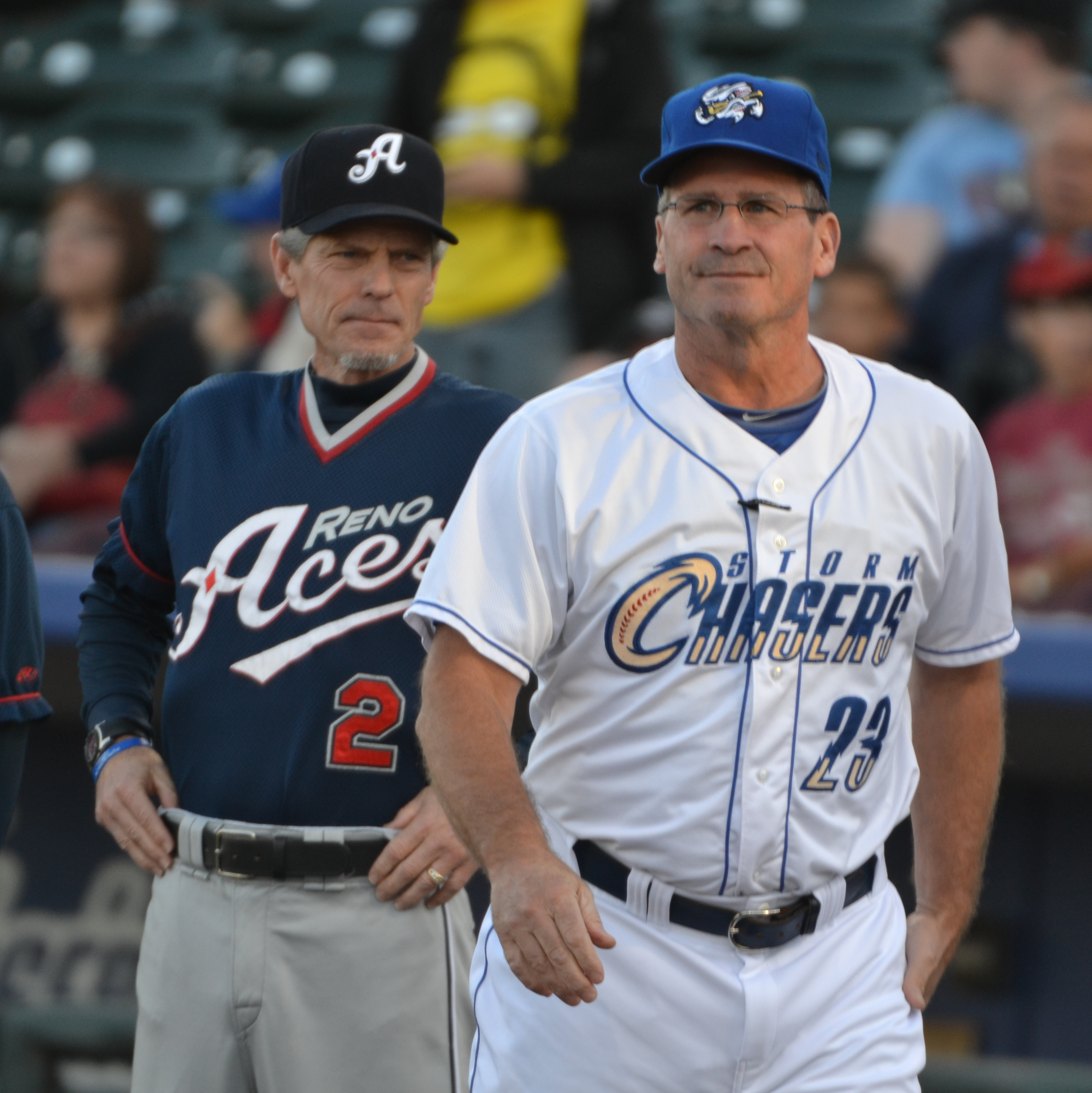
Jirschele (right) as manager of the Storm Chasers in 2012

On October 25, 2013, Jirschele was announced as a coach for the Kansas City Royals for the 2014 season. Later that season, he became the Royals' third base coach.

In Game 7 of the 2014 World Series, with the Royals down by one run with two outs in the bottom of the ninth against San Francisco Giants ace pitcher Madison Bumgarner, Alex Gordon hit a single to left field; Giants left fielder Gregor Blanco misplayed the ball, and Gordon advanced to third base where Jirschele stopped him. The next batter was catcher Salvador Pérez, who popped out to third baseman Pablo Sandoval in foul territory to end the game and the series in favor of the Giants. Jirschele's decision to stop Gordon from running to home plate was debated. The Kansas City Star arranged to have the fan theory tested with a college baseball team, and five of six times, the runner was thrown out (the one time the runner was safe was the fault of an overthrow).

The Royals returned to the playoffs in 2015 after winning the American League Central Division. In Game 6 of the American League Championship Series, after the Royals had given away a two-run lead and allowed the Toronto Blue Jays to tie the game, Eric Hosmer singled to right field with Lorenzo Cain on first base. When Blue Jays right fielder José Bautista threw to second base, Jirschele sent Cain home to score the run that would send the Royals back to the World Series, where they defeated the New York Mets in five games to win the team's second championship. Jirschele remained the team's third base coach through the 2019 season.

In 2021, Jirschele was bench coach for the Royals’ High-A affiliate, the Quad Cities River Bandits. Following the 2021 season, Jirschele, along with 2021 River Bandits manager Chris Widger were transferred to the Royals’ Double-A affiliate, the Northwest Arkansas Naturals. Jirschele maintained his role as bench coach.

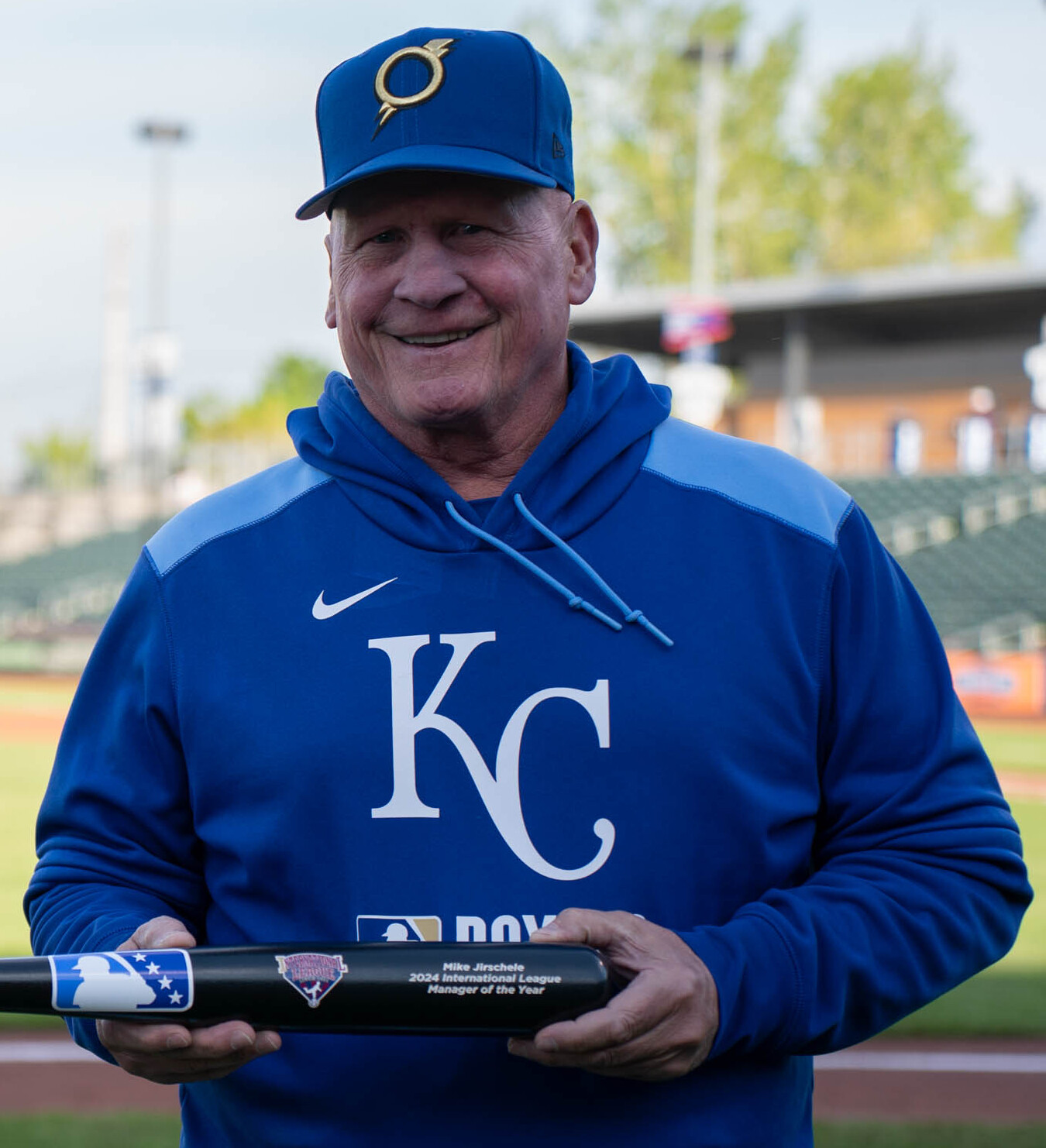
Jirschele receiving his 2024 Manager of the Year award

In 2023, Jirschele returned as manager of the Omaha Storm Chasers. On April 8, he recorded his 1,000th win as manager of Omaha's Triple-A team. He was named the International League manager of the year in 2024 after Omaha won a franchise-record 89 games and was runner-up in the Triple-A National Championship Game. Jirschele announced his retirement on October 10, 2025, after 48 years of involvement in professional baseball, including 17 with the Storm Chasers.

== Personal life ==
Jirschele is one of eight children. His three brothers, Doug, Pete and Jim, all suffered from muscular dystrophy and died in their 40s.

Jirschele and his wife have three children and four grandchildren. Their son Justin is the third base coach for the Chicago White Sox.

Jirschele worked for several years in a furniture store in the baseball off-season.
