= Edwin Encarnación =

Dominican baseball player (born 1983)

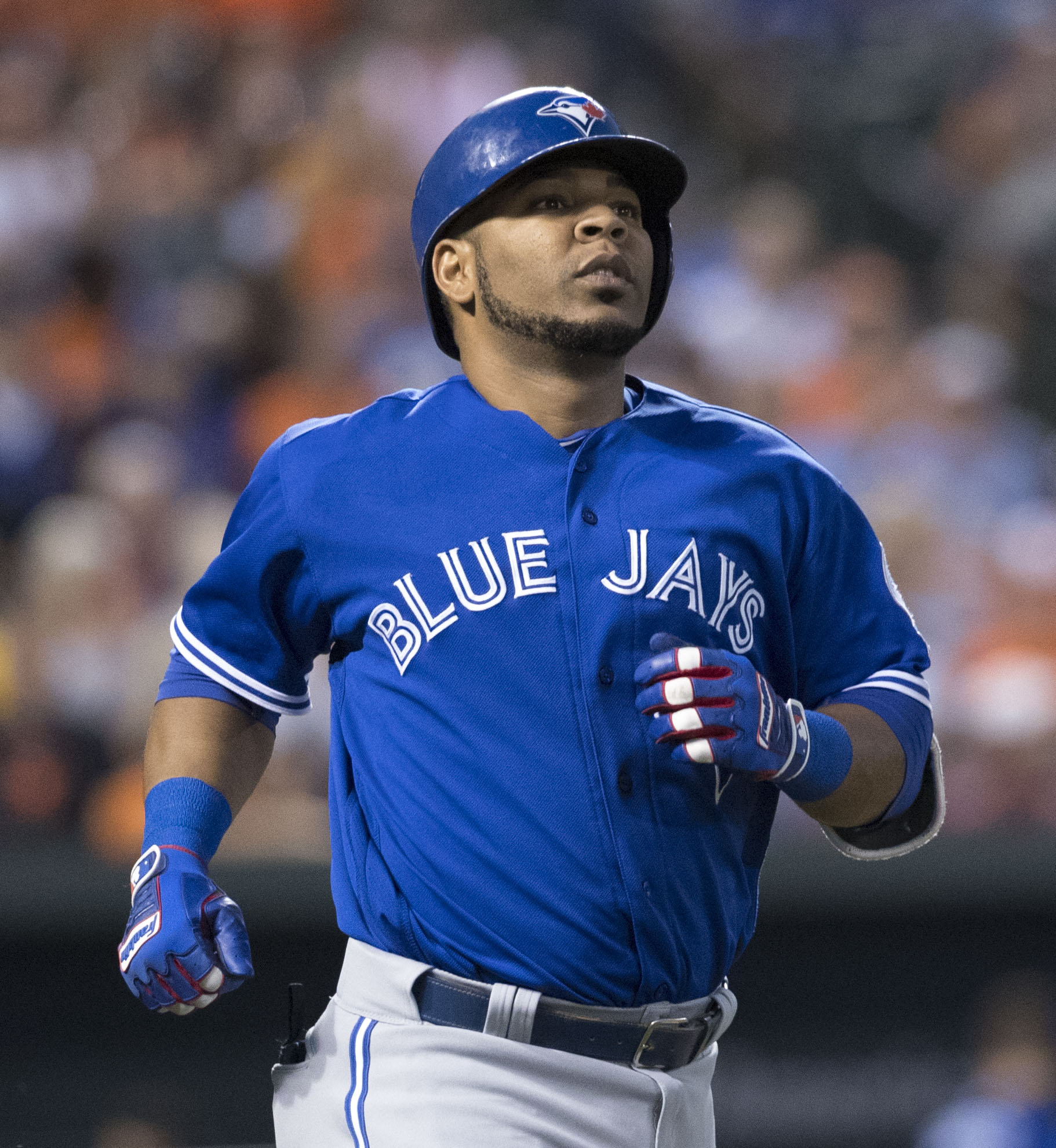
- Encarnación with the Toronto Blue Jays in 2016
- Designated hitter / Third baseman / First baseman
- Born: January 7, 1983 (age 43); La Romana, Dominican Republic
- Batted: Right Threw: Right

MLB debut
- June 24, 2005, for the Cincinnati Reds

Last MLB appearance
- September 27, 2020, for the Chicago White Sox

MLB statistics
- Batting average: .260
- Home runs: 424
- Runs batted in: 1,261
- Stats at Baseball Reference

Teams
- Cincinnati Reds (2005–2009); Toronto Blue Jays (2009–2016); Cleveland Indians (2017–2018); Seattle Mariners (2019); New York Yankees (2019); Chicago White Sox (2020)

Career highlights and awards
- 3× All-Star (2013, 2014, 2016); AL RBI leader (2016)
Medals
Men's baseball
Representing Dominican Republic
World Baseball Classic
Gold medal – first place	2013 San Francisco	Team

Edwin Elpidio Encarnación Rivera (born January 7, 1983) is a Dominican former professional baseball designated hitter, third baseman and first baseman. He played in Major League Baseball (MLB) for the Cincinnati Reds, Toronto Blue Jays, Cleveland Indians, Seattle Mariners, New York Yankees, and Chicago White Sox.

Encarnación was initially drafted in 2000 by the Texas Rangers but was subsequently traded to the Cincinnati Reds, where he eventually made his major league debut in 2005. His playing time as a third baseman gradually rose year to year, and he had his first 20-HR season in 2008 with 26 home runs. He was traded midway through the 2009 season to the Toronto Blue Jays. He would play a variety of positions there in third base, first base, and designated hitter for eight seasons. He reached a new career high in home runs with 42 in 2012; he was named an All-Star for the first time in 2013 and did so again in 2014, which saw him hit 30 home runs each time. He reached the postseason for the first time in 2015 and did so again in 2016, where the Blue Jays lost in the ALCS each time. He left for Cleveland in free agency after 2016, hitting thirty home runs in each of his two seasons before being traded to Seattle. He was traded midway through the year to New York but hit 34 total home runs to reach the 400 home run club. Encarnación signed with the White Sox in 2020 and had ten home runs in the pandemic-shortened season. After not being signed in the offseason, Encarnación retired.

A batter who hit 20+ home runs in ten different seasons, Encarnación was named an All-Star three times for his career.

== Early life ==
Encarnación was born in the Dominican Republic to Elpidio Encarnación, a track and field coach, and Mireya Rivera. He is the third of three sons, including Richard and Julio, and four children, including younger sister, Evelin. Encarnación also had twelve half-siblings via his father. Encarnación split time as a high school student between his native country and Puerto Rico after his father took a job coaching at a Puerto Rican college. His Puerto Rican residence made him eligible for the Major League Baseball draft.

== Professional career ==
=== Cincinnati Reds ===
The Texas Rangers selected Encarnación in the ninth round of the 2000 Major League Baseball draft, and he signed with them. On June 15, 2001, the Rangers traded him and Rubén Mateo to the Cincinnati Reds in exchange for pitcher Rob Bell. He made his Major League Baseball debut on June 24, 2005, and played in 69 games. He finished with a .232 batting average, nine home runs, and 31 runs batted in (RBIs).

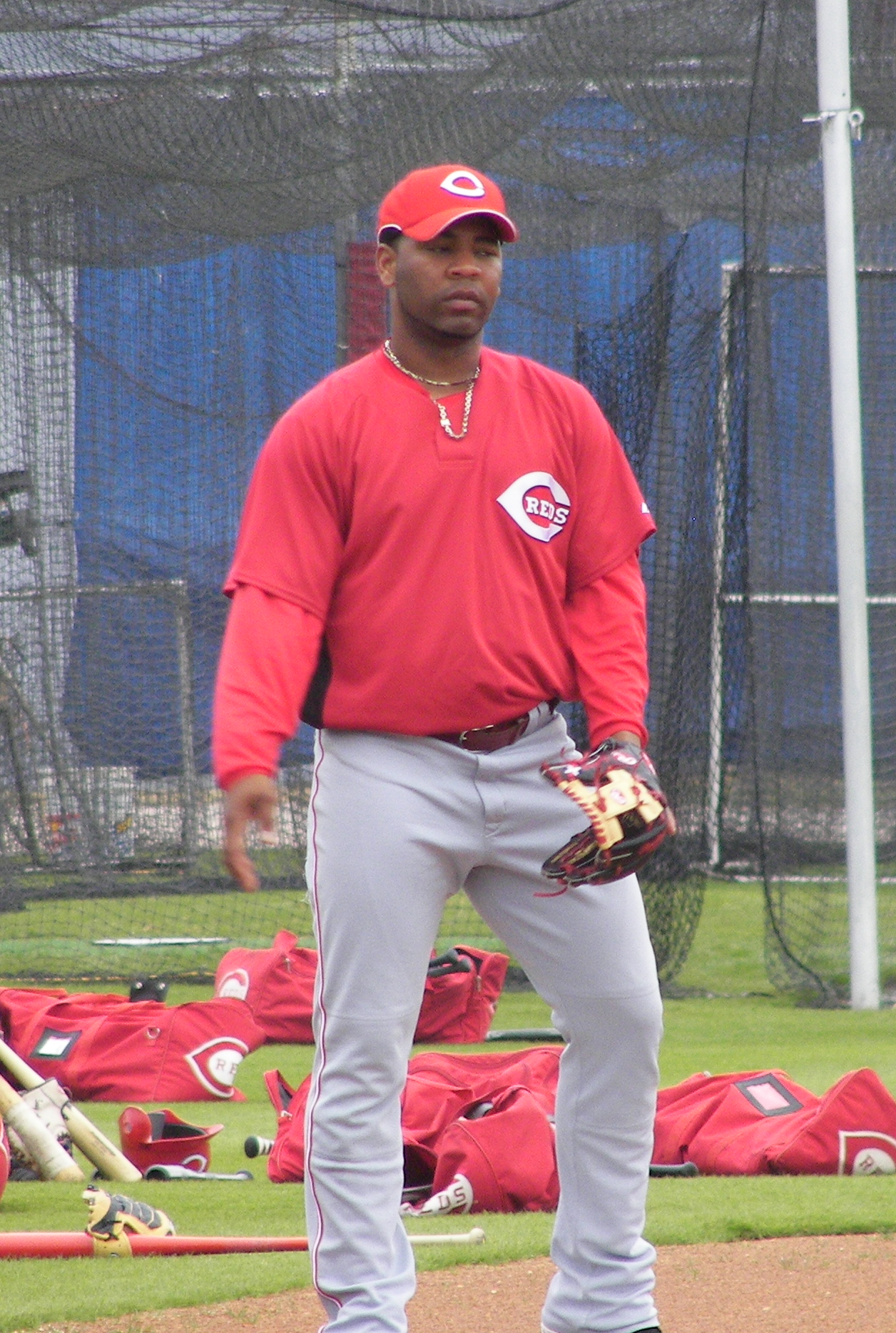
Encarnación with the Cincinnati Reds

In the 2006 season, Encarnación played 117 games for the Reds, and batted .276 with 15 home runs and 72 RBIs. Encarnación won the National League Player of the Week award for the week of August 7–13. During the week, he led the league with 4 home runs and 24 total bases, batting .440 with eight RBIs. In 2007, Encarnación started the year slowly, struggling to bat over .200. He was frequently benched in favor of Ryan Freel, which gave Josh Hamilton, who was attempting to resurrect his career after it was derailed by addiction to drugs and alcohol, more starts in center field. Encarnación was benched again at one point by then manager Jerry Narron for not running out a fly ball. On May 10, 2007, Encarnación was demoted to the Reds' Triple-A affiliate, the Louisville Bats. He was recalled to the Major Leagues on May 22, 2007. For the 2007 season, Encarnación batted .289 with 16 home runs and 76 RBI.

In 2008, Encarnación set career highs in games played and home runs. He batted .251 in 146 games with 26 home runs and 68 RBIs, and also struck out 102 times, the first time he had struck out more than 100 times in his career. For the 2009 season, Encarnación stated that he wanted to be more consistent as a hitter who did not try to hit home runs in every at bat: "I want to try to stay more to the middle. Last year, I tried to pull too many balls and hit more homers. That's why my average went down. I will be more consistent as a hitter. I know I can do it. I've done it before. I know I can hit better than that and I just have to keep working". Encarnación played in 43 games with the Reds in the 2009 season, batting just .209 with five home runs and 16 RBIs before being traded to Toronto.

=== Toronto Blue Jays ===
==== 2009–2011 ====
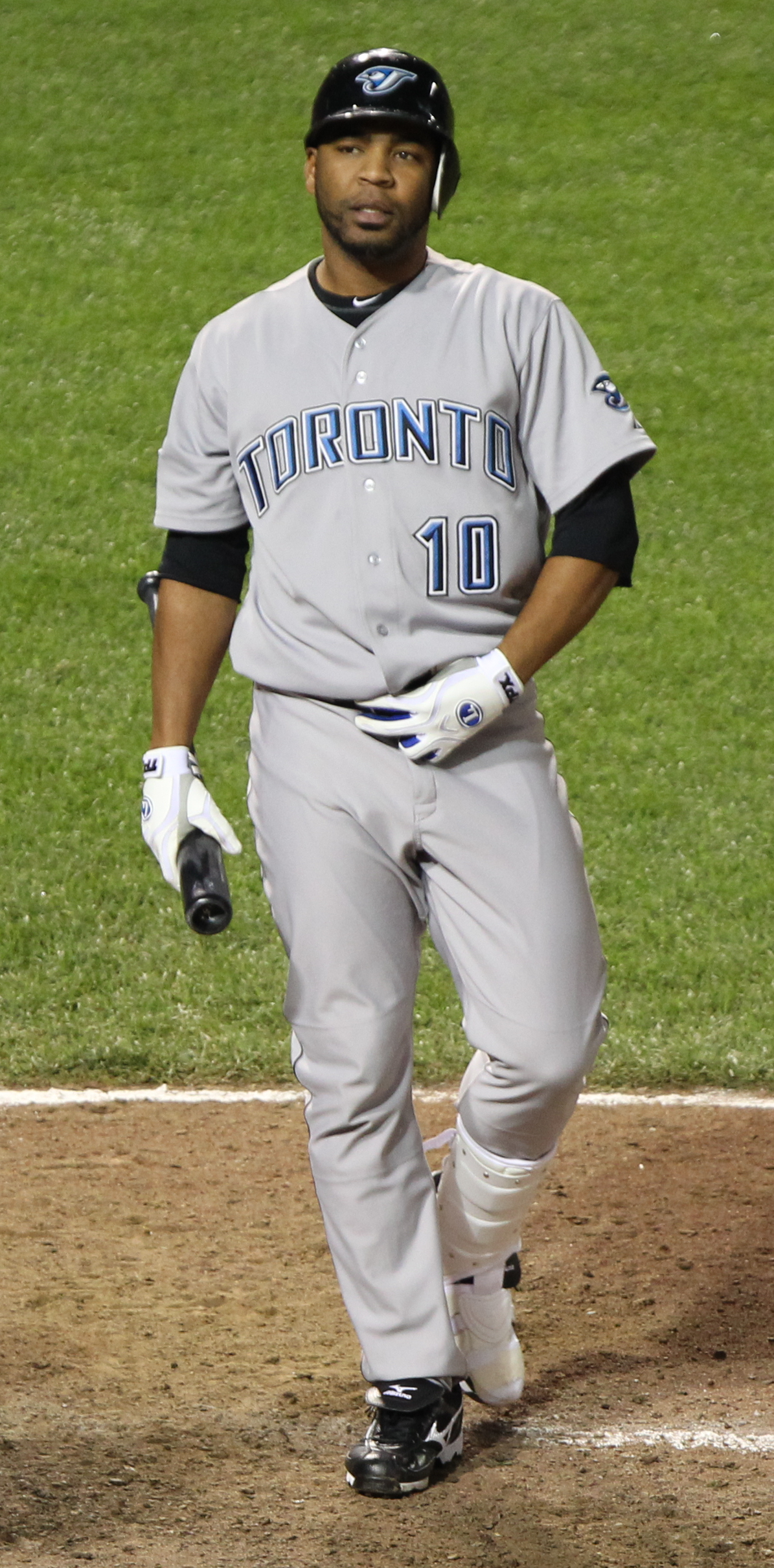
Encarnación in 2011

Encarnación, along with right-handed pitchers Josh Roenicke and Zach Stewart, was traded to the Toronto Blue Jays for Scott Rolen on July 31, 2009. It was reported that then Blue Jays General Manager J. P. Ricciardi was only interested in acquiring Roenicke and Stewart, but Cincinnati would not accept the trade unless the Blue Jays also took on Encarnación. Encarnación played in 42 games for the Blue Jays during the 2009 season, and batted .240 with eight home runs and 23 RBIs. During the offseason, Encarnación suffered first and second-degree burns to the forehead and the right side of his face when a rocket firecracker hit him in the jaw and exploded near his mouth. After initially being treated near his Dominican Republic home, Encarnacion was transferred to a Miami hospital. He was discharged less than two days after the incident.

Encarnación missed 30 games through April and May 2010 with a right arm injury, before returning on May 18. He hit a home run in his first at bat since the injury against the Minnesota Twins. On May 21, he had three home runs against the Arizona Diamondbacks, homering in three straight at-bats. On June 20, after a loss to the Giants, Encarnacion was optioned to the Triple-A Las Vegas 51s. However, in a surprise move, he was designated for assignment the next day by the Blue Jays. Encarnación was eventually assigned to Triple-A Las Vegas on June 23, but was called up to the Blue Jays again on July 2 after a struggling performance by Encarnacion's replacement, Jarrett Hoffpauir. Encarnacion hit his 100th career home run against the Minnesota Twins on the last day of the season, also becoming the seventh Jays player that season with at least 20 home runs. He finished the 2010 season with a batting average of .244, 21 home runs and 51 RBI.

On November 12, 2010, Encarnacion was claimed off waivers by the Oakland Athletics. On December 2, he was non-tendered by the Athletics, making him a free agent. On December 16, 2010, he signed a one-year deal with the Blue Jays worth $2.5 million, with a club option worth $3.5 million in 2012. He began the 2011 season playing third base for the Blue Jays and struggled offensively. His numbers improved significantly after he was moved to the designated hitter position. In a game against the Boston Red Sox on September 7, Encarnacion set a new career record for doubles in a single season with 34. On September 22, Encarnacion hit a walk-off home run off the Rogers Sportsnet One sign in the 12th inning against Angels rookie Garrett Richards. In 2011, Encarnación batted .272 with 17 home runs and 55 RBIs.

On October 31, 2011, the Blue Jays picked up the $3.5 million club option for the 2012 season.

==== 2012–2013 ====
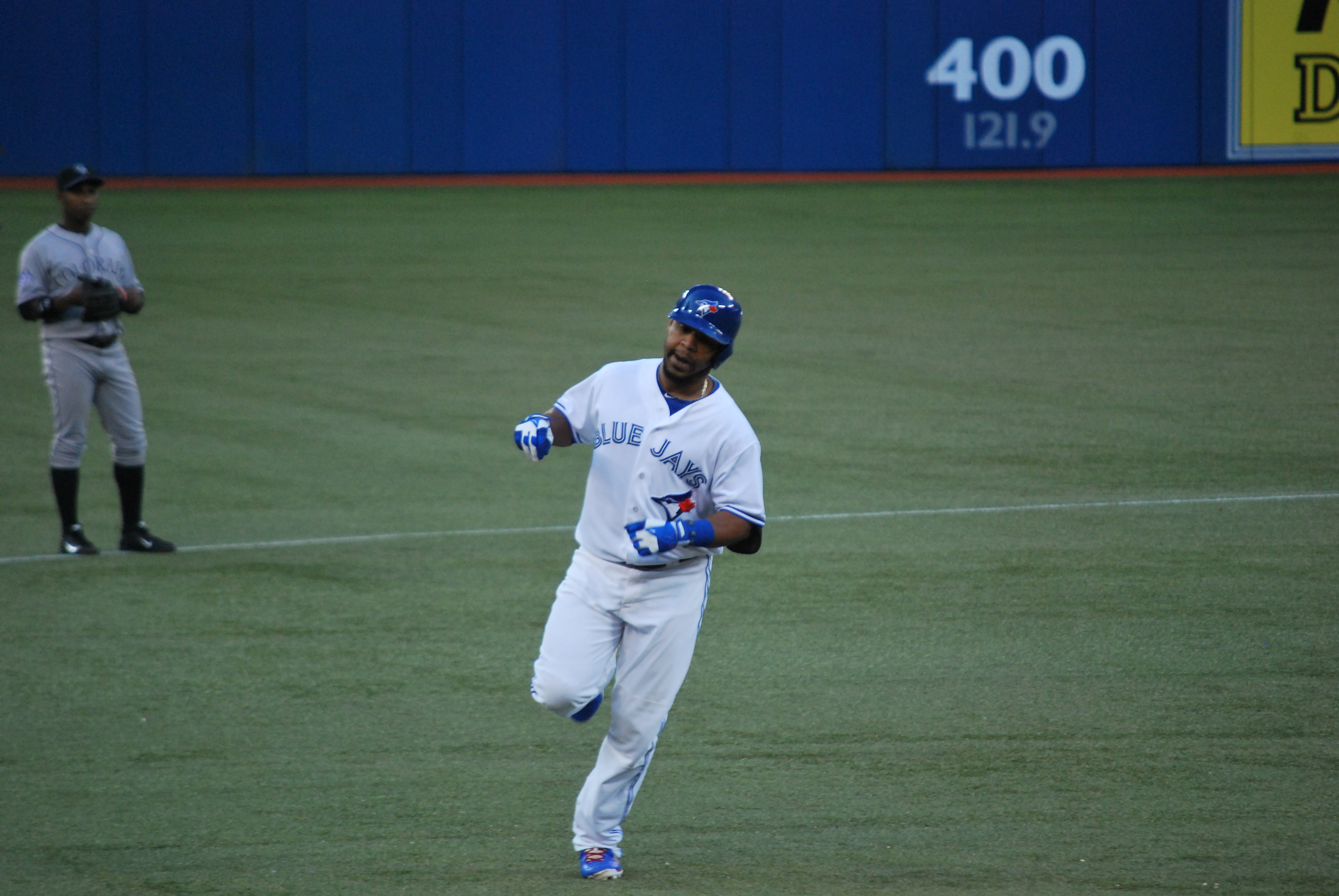
Encarnación "walking the parrot" in a game against the Colorado Rockies in June 2013

In a game against the Seattle Mariners on April 28, 2012, Encarnación hit his fourth career grand slam in the 8th inning leading the Blue Jays to a 7–0 win. His grand slam marked the first time that Encarnación held his arm out in his trademark "Ed-wing" fashion while rounding the bases. This trademark would be known as the "Parrot Walk" which Edwin would do for every home run he would hit from then on. Fans would mimic it in the stands and even flap their arms as though they were the wings of a parrot. It was so popular it generated T-shirts, hats and even toy parrots that fans could attach to their right arm.

On April 30, 2012, in a home game against the Texas Rangers, Encarnación hit the first home run off of starter Yu Darvish. In an inter-league game against the Milwaukee Brewers on June 19, Encarnación hit the last of three straight solo home runs by the Blue Jays, following Colby Rasmus and José Bautista, the first time in the 2012 season that the Jays went back-to-back-to-back with home runs, and only the sixth time in franchise history. On July 12, Encarnación signed a 3-year, $27 million contract extension with Toronto. The deal included a $10 million club option for the 2016 season.

On September 13, 2012, in a home game against the Seattle Mariners, Encarnación hit his 40th home run of the season (off starter Félix Hernández), and recorded his 100th RBI of the season, marking the first time in his career that he had surpassed 40 home runs and 100 RBIs. Encarnación was unanimously named by the Baseball Writers' Association of America (BBWAA) as the Blue Jays Player of the Year on November 28, 2012. He also received the Most Improved Player award for the Jays.

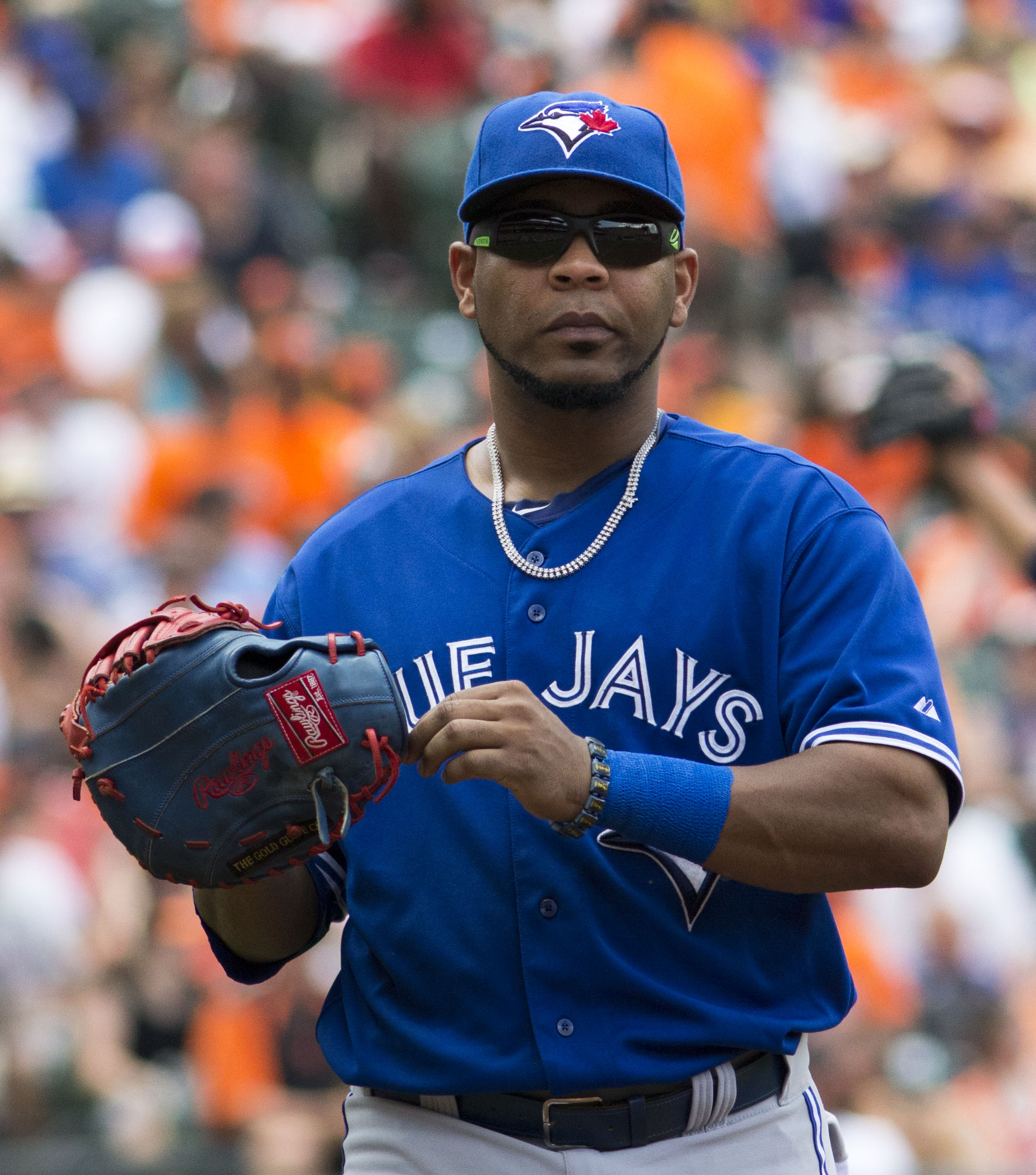
Encarnación in 2013

On May 23, 2013, Encarnación hit his fifth career grand slam to give the Blue Jays an 8–3 lead over the Baltimore Orioles. The Jays would win the game 12–6.

On July 6, 2013, Encarnación was named to his first All-Star Game as a reserve designated hitter for the American League. Encarnación was one of four Blue Jays to be named, the others being José Bautista, Brett Cecil, and Steve Delabar. Up to the All-Star break, Encarnación posted a triple-slash of .264/.353/.532 with 25 home runs and 72 RBIs. In the All-Star Game, Encarnación entered as a pinch-hitter for David Ortiz in the seventh inning, and finished the game 0–2. In a game against the Houston Astros on July 26, 2013, Encarnación became only the second Blue Jay in franchise history to hit two home runs in one inning, joining Joe Carter who did so on October 3, 1993 – tying the Major League record for most home runs in an inning. Leading off the 7th inning behind at 6–4, Encarnación hit a solo home run and would later hit his sixth career grand slam, receiving a curtain call afterwards as the Blue Jays would score 8 runs in the inning and lead 12–6. He was named the American League Player of the Week on July 29, after batting .520 with three doubles, two home runs, and eight RBIs over the prior week. Encarnación hit his 30th home run of the season on August 7, 2013, against the Seattle Mariners. In doing so, he recorded back-to-back 30 home run seasons for the first time in his career. Playing against the Kansas City Royals on August 31, 2013, Encarnación recorded his 1,000th career hit, a single off Kansas City starter Jeremy Guthrie. On September 2, he reached 100 RBIs for the second consecutive season on a two-run home run against Brandon McCarthy of the Arizona Diamondbacks. He spent time on the bench in mid September with a wrist injury, but made a brief comeback before being placed on the disabled list on September 17. He underwent successful surgery on September 19. Encarnación finished the 2013 season with a .272 average, 36 home runs, and 104 RBIs. He finished with more walks than strikeouts for the first time in his career, with 82 and 62 respectively.

==== 2014–2016 ====
Encarnación hit his 200th career home run on May 8, 2014, against A. J. Burnett of the Philadelphia Phillies. On May 12, he was named the American League Player of the Week for May 5–11, when he recorded a league-leading four home runs and 10 RBIs, and batted .321. Encarnación continued his hot hitting in May by becoming the first player in Blue Jays franchise history to have 4 multi home run games in a month, and the first player in the majors to do so since Troy Tulowitzki in September 2010. On May 26 he established a new club record for home runs in May by hitting his 13th off of Álex Colomé of the Tampa Bay Rays. The following day, Encarnación tied the team record for home runs in any month of the season, when he hit his 14th to help the Blue Jays extend their winning streak to 8 games.

On May 29, in a home game against the Kansas City Royals, Encarnación hit two home runs for a total of 18 on the season and 16 in the month of May, giving him the Blue Jays franchise record for home runs in any month of the regular season. He also tied Mickey Mantle for the American League record for home runs in May. He was unanimously selected as the Blue Jays Player of the Month by the Toronto chapter of the BBWAA on June 2. A day later he was named the AL Player of the Month of May by MLB. Encarnación hit two 3-run home runs in a win over the Cincinnati Reds on June 20. His 6 RBIs were a key contribution in helping the Blue Jays to their second-largest comeback victory in franchise history, being down 8–0 after the second inning and going on to win 14–9. In total for 2014, Encarnación batted .268 with 34 home runs and 98 RBIs.

On June 30, 2015, Encarnación earned 10-and-5 rights by having at least 10 years of service time in the big-leagues, with the last 5 being on the same team. These rights give Encarnación the ability to veto any trade he would be involved in. He joined teammate José Bautista on the list of active players to hold this distinction. Encarnación hit his 250th career home run on August 6, in a 9–3 win over the Minnesota Twins. In an 8–5 win over the Phillies on August 18, Encarnación surpassed Jesse Barfield on the Blue Jays' all-time home run list, hitting his 180th home run with the franchise. He also extended his hitting streak to a career-high 15 games. Encarnación extended his hitting streak to 24 games on August 29, hitting 3 home runs against the Detroit Tigers, including his third grand slam of the season, and tied Roy Howell's franchise record with nine RBIs in one game. The following day, Encarnación broke the franchise record for RBIs in one month, when he hit a solo home run to give him 35 RBIs in August. He was named the AL Player of the Week on August 31, after batting .391 with 6 home runs and 17 RBIs. On September 2, Encarnación won the AL Player of the Month award for the second time in his career, after batting .407 with 11 home runs and 35 RBIs in August. He finished the 2015 regular season with a .277 batting average, 39 home runs, and 111 RBIs.

Encarnación played in all 5 games of the AL Division Series, and batted .333 with one home run and 3 RBIs. In the AL Championship Series, he hit .227 with two RBIs in 6 games. On October 27, Encarnación underwent successful sports hernia surgery. On November 3, the Blue Jays exercised their $10 million option for Encarnación in 2016.

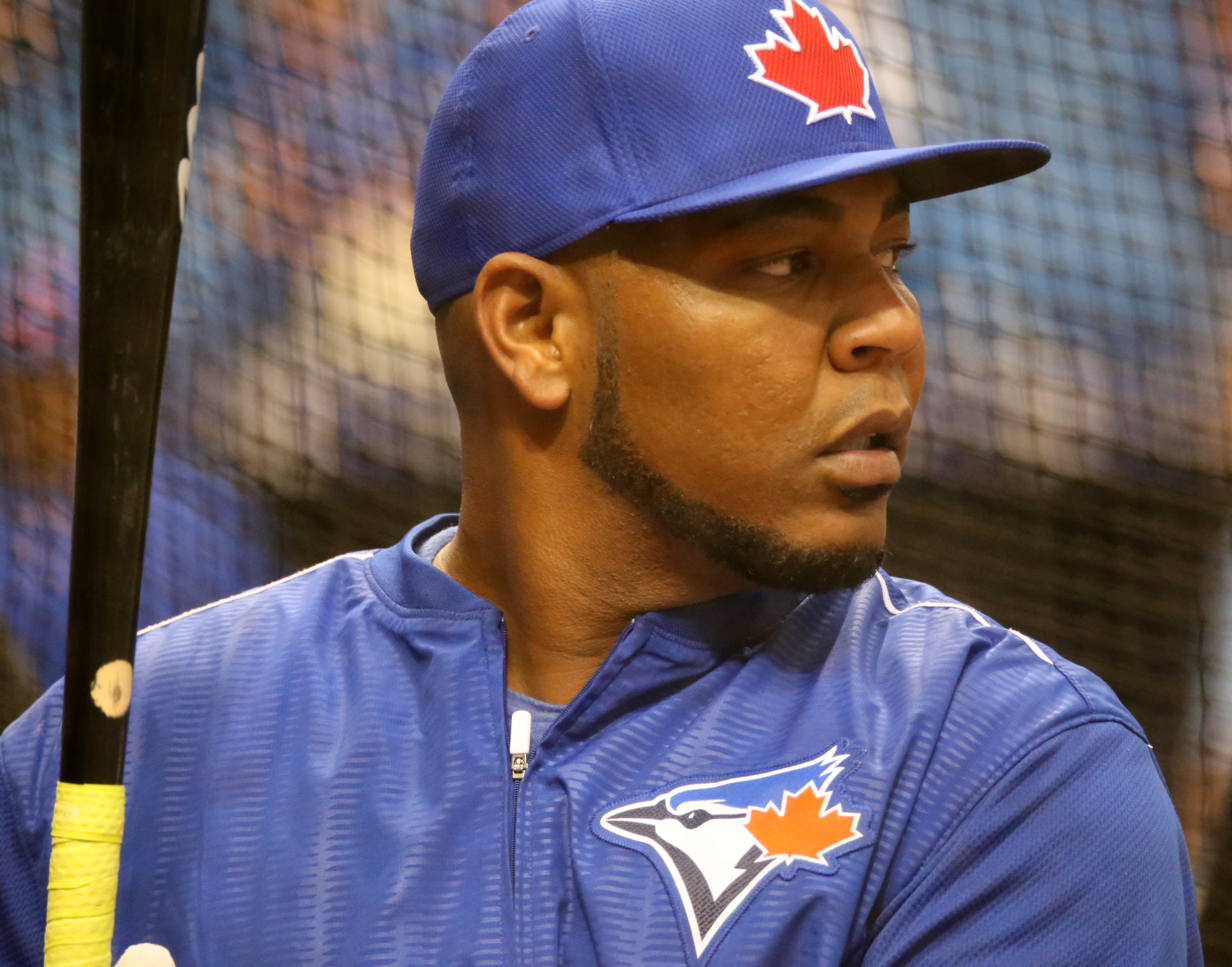
Encarnación on 2016 Opening Day

Prior to 2016 spring training, Encarnación set an Opening Day deadline to negotiate a contract extension with the Blue Jays. He suffered an oblique injury early in the spring, and as a result did not participate in any major league spring training games. In addition, contract extension negotiations ended early, when both sides could not agree on the terms of the contract. On April 26, Encarnación hit his 200th home run with the Blue Jays. Encarnación hit his fourth walk-off home run as a Blue Jay on June 10, defeating the Baltimore Orioles 4–3 in the tenth inning. In doing so, he became the Blue Jays all-time leader in walk-off home runs as well as the eighth player in franchise history to reach 600 RBI. In the first inning of a game on July 1, Encarnación was ejected by home plate umpire Vic Carapazza for arguing balls and strikes. He made contact with Carapazza after being ejected, and on July 3, was given a one-game suspension. On August 12, Encarnación hit the 300th home run of his career, joining Joe Carter, Carlos Delgado, and teammate José Bautista as the only players to hit their 300th home run with the Blue Jays franchise. Encarnación recorded his 100th RBI of the season in a 12–6 win over the New York Yankees on August 16, becoming the first player to reach the milestone in 2016. On September 16, he hit his 40th home run of the season, and joined José Bautista and Carlos Delgado as the only Blue Jays with multiple 40-homer seasons.

In the eleventh inning of the 2016 Wild Card game, Encarnación hit a walk-off, three-run home run to give the Blue Jays a 5–2 victory over the Baltimore Orioles and send them to the American League Division Series to face the Texas Rangers. The Blue Jays eventually lost the ALCS to the Cleveland Indians in five games. On November 7, the Blue Jays extended a $17.2 million qualifying offer to Encarnación, which he declined on November 14.

=== Cleveland Indians ===
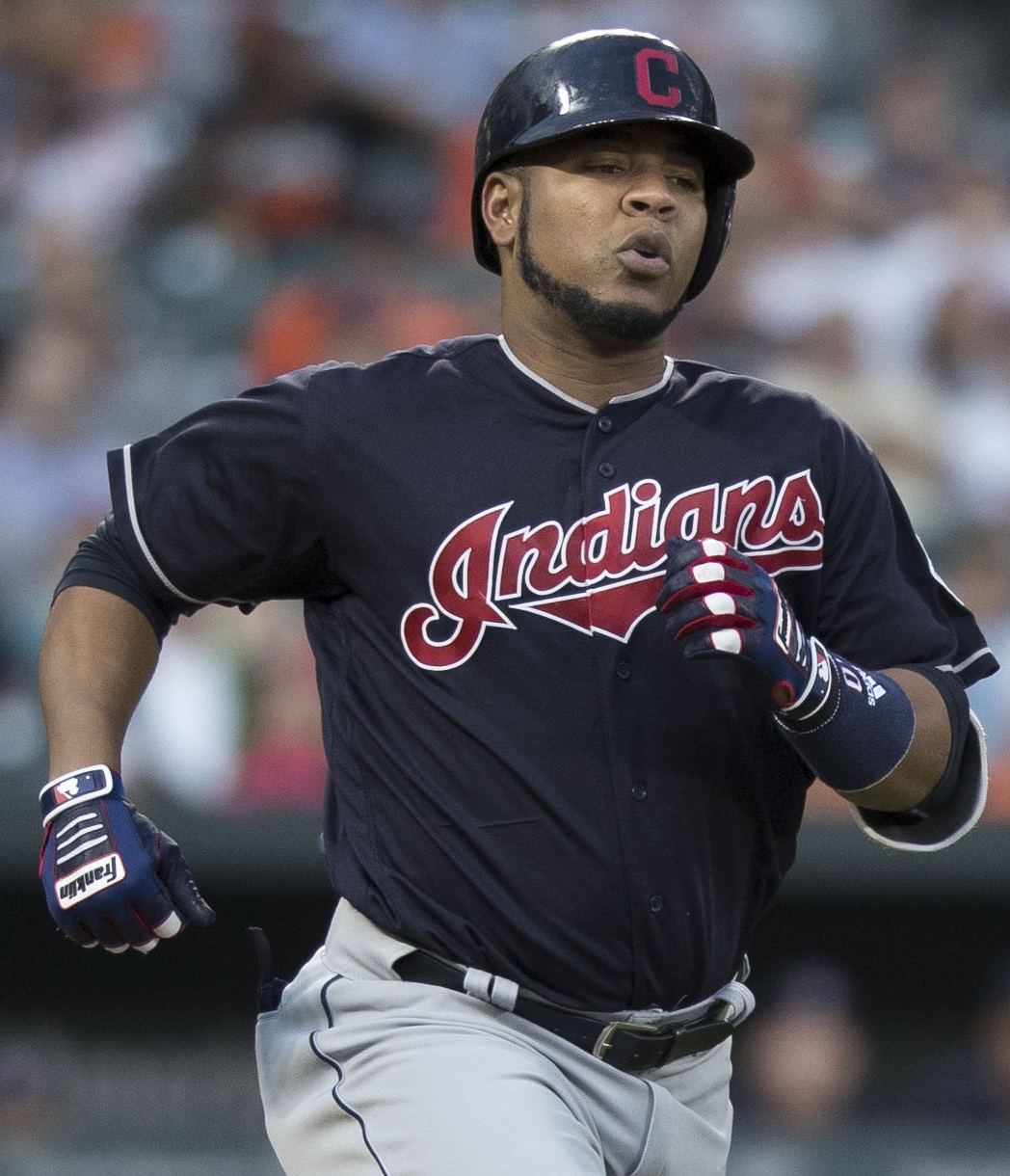
Encarnación with the Indians

On January 5, 2017, Encarnación signed a three-year contract with the Cleveland Indians worth $60 million. The deal included a club option for the 2020 season worth an additional $25 million, with a $5 million buyout clause. On Opening Day, he hit a home run against the Texas Rangers. On July 25, 2017, in the first game of a series against the Los Angeles Angels of Anaheim, Encarnación hit a walk-off grand slam in the bottom of the 11th inning, winning the game 11-7 for the Indians. In his first season with the Indians, he hit .258 with 38 home runs and 107 RBIs. He also drew a career high 104 walks.

On August 12, 2018, Encarnación was placed on the disabled list with a hand contusion, his second stint on the disabled list in the season. He finished the season with 32 home runs and 107 RBIs, his seventh consecutive season of over 30 home runs and his fourth consecutive season of 100 or more RBIs. However, he batted .246.

=== Seattle Mariners ===
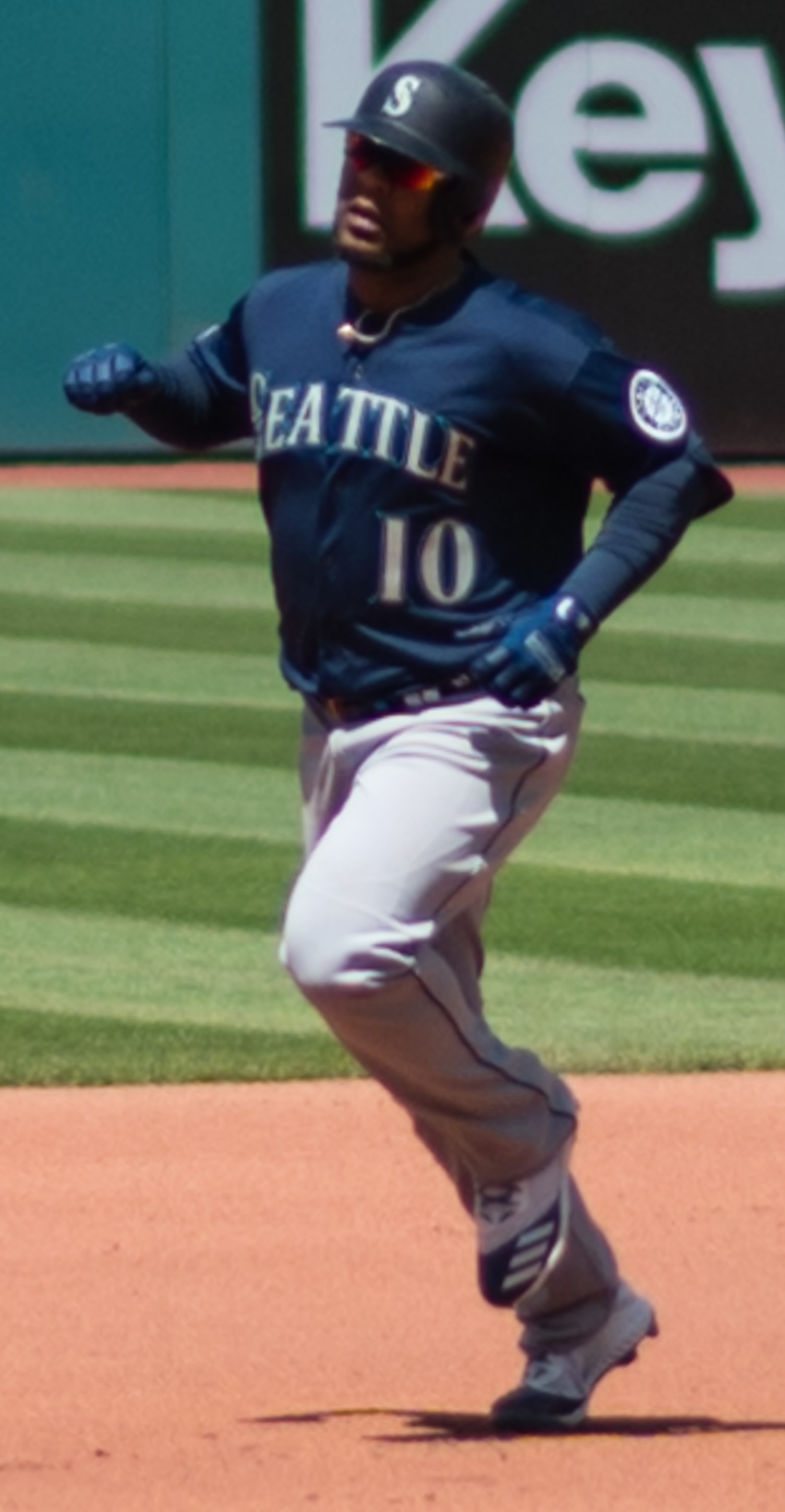
Encarnación with the Mariners

On December 13, 2018, the Indians traded Encarnación to the Seattle Mariners in a three-team trade with the Tampa Bay Rays that sent Carlos Santana to the Indians, with the Indians also acquiring Jake Bauers from the Rays, with the Rays getting Yandy Díaz and Cole Sulser. Encarnación hit his first home run as a Mariner on March 28, 2019. On April 8, he hit two home runs in the sixth inning against the Kansas City Royals, becoming the fifth player in major league history to hit two home runs in the same inning twice. In 65 games with the Mariners through mid-June, Encarnación batted .241 with 21 home runs and 49 RBIs.

=== New York Yankees ===
On June 15, 2019, the Mariners traded Encarnación to the New York Yankees for minor league pitcher Juan Then and cash. On August 3, Encarnación was hit by a pitch; he left the game with a fractured right wrist, and was placed on the 10-day injured list later that day. On October 31, the Yankees announced they would not be exercising their club option for Encarnación for 2020, making him a free agent.

=== Chicago White Sox ===
On January 9, 2020, Encarnación signed a 1-year deal with the Chicago White Sox. On July 24, 2020, he was the starting designated hitter, making his White Sox debut on Opening Day against the Minnesota Twins.

In the pandemic-shortened 2020 season, Encarnación batted .157/.250/.377 with 10 home runs and 19 RBIs, while striking out 54 times in 159 at bats.

== Coaching career ==
On February 24, 2023, Encarnación joined the coaching staff of the Toronto Blue Jays, helping to assist the club during spring training.

== Personal life ==
Encarnación and his wife have two children. He also has a child from a previous relationship.

== See also ==
- List of Major League Baseball career home run leaders
- List of Toronto Blue Jays team records
- Major League Baseball Player of the Week Award
