= List of Scranton/Wilkes-Barre Highlanders managers =

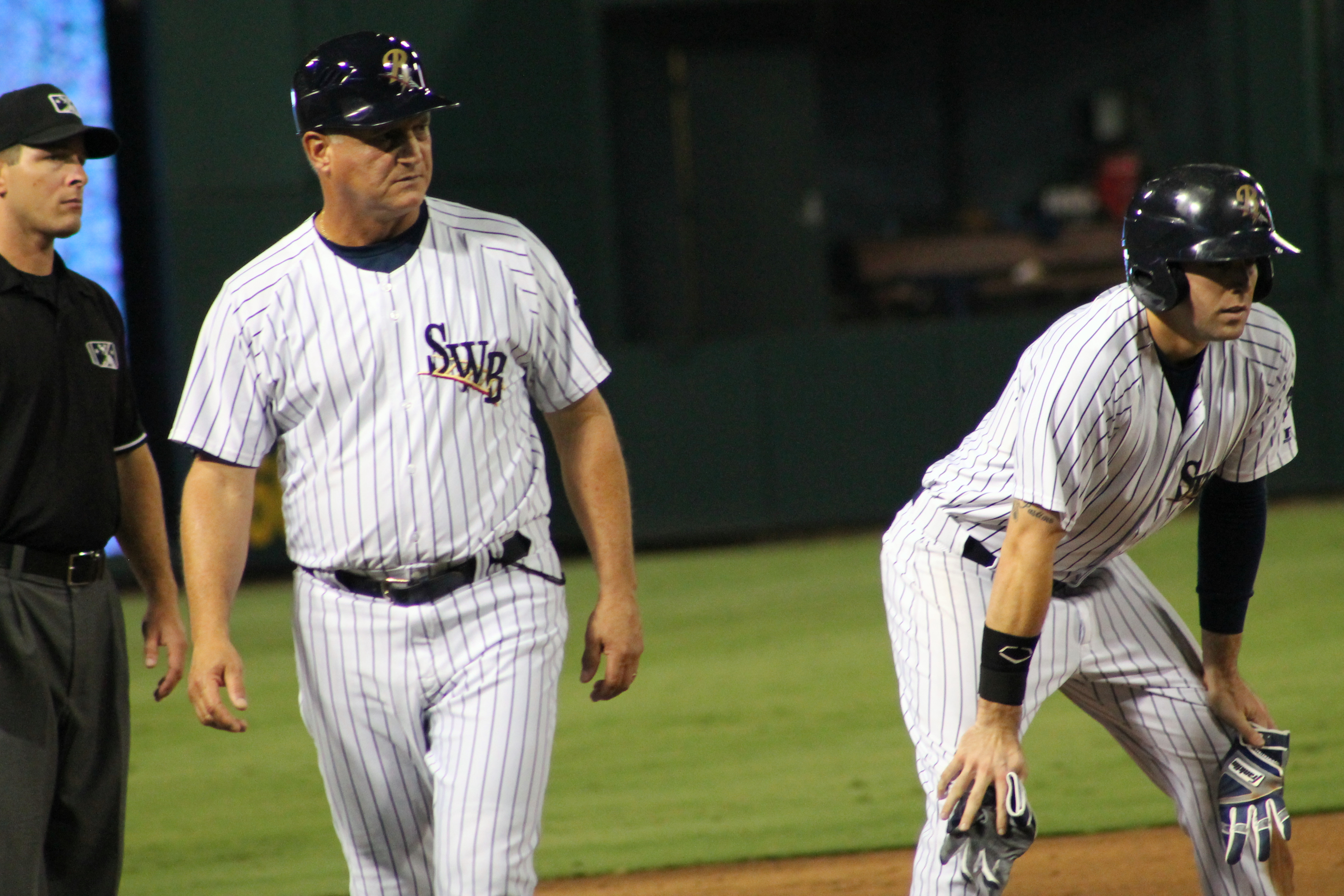
Manager Al Pedrique observes Jake Cave during the 2016 Triple-A Championship Game.

The Scranton/Wilkes-Barre Highlanders Minor League Baseball team has played in the Scranton–Wilkes-Barre metropolitan area of Pennsylvania since being established in 1989 as a Triple-A International League team. They were known as the Scranton/Wilkes-Barre Red Barons during their affiliation with the Philadelphia Phillies from 1989 to 2006 before becoming the Scranton/Wilkes-Barre Yankees in 2007 upon affiliating with the New York Yankees. They rebranded as the RailRiders in 2013 while maintaining their Yankees affiliation. With the restructuring of the minor leagues in 2021, they were placed in the Triple-A East, which became the International League in 2022. They rebranded to the Highlanders after the 2026 season. The team has been led by 17 managers throughout its history. Managers are responsible for team strategy and leadership on and off the field, including determining the batting order, arranging defensive positioning, and making tactical decisions regarding pitching changes, pinch-hitting, pinch-running, and defensive replacements. Shelley Duncan was the team's manager in 2026.

Five managers have been selected as their league's Manager of the Year. Lee Elia (1992), Marc Bombard (2002), John Russell (2006), Dave Miley (2007 and 2012) and Al Pedrique (2016 and 2017) have won the International League Manager of the Year Award. Dave Miley has won 714 games over nine seasons (2007–2015), placing him first on the all-time wins list for Scranton/Wilkes-Barre managers. Having managed the team for 1286 games, he was also the longest-tenured manager in team history. The manager with the highest winning percentage over a full season or more is Al Pedrique (2016–2017), with .623 respectively. Conversely, the lowest winning percentage over a season or more is .437 by manager George Culver (1993).

As of the completion of the 2024 season, Scranton/Wilkes-Barre's managers have led the club for 4,999 regular-season games in which they have compiled a win–loss record of 2,665–2,334 (.533). In 16 postseason appearances, their teams have a record of 44–51 (.463) and have won two International League championships. Combining all 5,094 regular-season and postseason games, the Highlanders have an all-time record of 2,709–2,385 (.532).

== History ==
=== Phillies affiliation ===
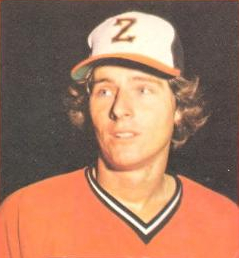
Bill Dancy led the Red Barons from 1989 to 1991 and again in 2001 as an interim manager.

Playing in the International League as the Triple-A affiliate of the Philadelphia Phillies, the Scranton/Wilkes-Barre Red Barons were managed by Bill Dancy in their inaugural 1989 season. Dancy had been part of the Philadelphia Phillies organization since 1979, managing several of their minor league affiliates across different levels. He began his managerial career with the Spartanburg Phillies (Class A) in 1979, followed by three seasons with the Peninsula Pilots (Class A) from 1980 to 1982. In 1983, he moved up to Double-A, managing the Reading Phillies for two seasons through 1984. Dancy was then promoted to Triple-A, where he managed the Portland Beavers from 1985 to 1986 and the Maine Phillies in 1987. He returned to Double-A in 1988 for a second stint with Reading.

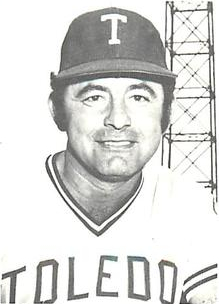
Lee Elia led the Red Barons to their first playoff appearance in 1992, falling to the Columbus Clippers in the ILCS.

Dancy was replaced in 1992 by Lee Elia, a veteran manager with eight seasons of minor league experience. Under Elia's leadership, the Red Barons posted their first winning season, finishing 84–58 and claiming the International League's Eastern Division title. They advanced to the playoffs, defeating the Pawtucket Red Sox in four games before falling to the Columbus Clippers in a five-game championship series. Following Elia's retirement, George Culver was hired as the Red Barons' new manager. Culver had previously managed the Philadelphia Phillies' minor league affiliates, leading Double-A Reading from 1986 to 1987 and Triple-A Maine in 1988. His tenure in Scranton/Wilkes-Barre lasted one season, as the team finished with a losing 62–80 record, missing the playoffs.

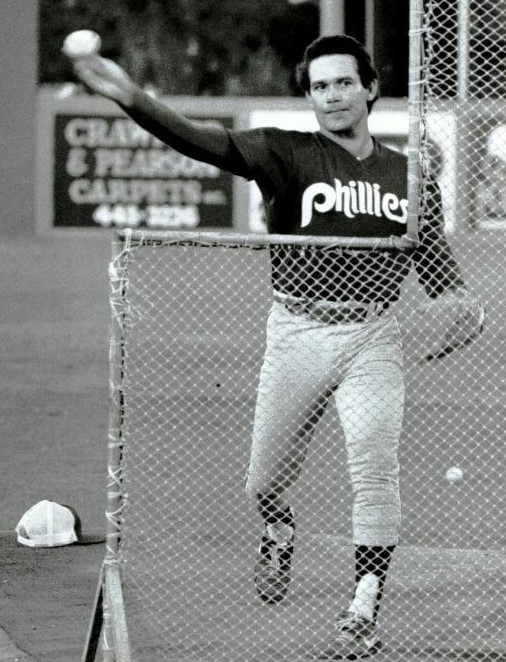
Ramón Avilés served as interim manager for the Red Barons in 1996 during Butch Hobson's absence.

After Mike Quade managed the Red Barons for two seasons (1994–1995), the team hired Butch Hobson as his successor. In May 1996, Hobson was arrested for cocaine possession and placed on leave. Ramón Avilés was named interim manager on May 6 and led the team for the remainder of the season. Hobson was dismissed in August after compiling a 13–14 record with the team. Avilés finished the season with a 57–58 record, as the Red Barons missed the playoffs for a fourth consecutive year.

In 1997, the Red Barons hired Marc Bombard. Over the next four seasons, he managed the team to two consecutive IL championships, losing to the Indianapolis Indians in 2000 and the Louisville RiverBats in 2001. (Note: The 2001 playoffs were cancelled in the wake of the September 11 terrorist attacks. Louisville, which had won the first game of the series before its cancellation, was declared the winner.) However, prior to the IL championship, the season had some surprising events. On May 6, 2001, Bombard was promoted to the Philadelphia Phillies to serve as interim third base coach. Red Barons hitting coach Jerry Martin served as interim manager for two days before being succeeded by Phillies field coordinator, and former Red Barons manager, Bill Dancy, and roving hitting instructor Donnie Long. Martin then came back as interim manager before Bombard returned to the team on July 14. Although the Red Barons finished their 2002 campaign by getting swept in the International League semifinals against the Buffalo Bisons, the Phillies announced on October 17, 2002, that Bombard would continue to manage the Red Barons for the 2003 campaign. Bombard continued to manage the Red Barons until 2004. However, on October 4, 2006, the Phillies fired Bombard along with two other staff members on the Phillies: third-base coach Dancy and bench coach Gary Varsho. Even though the Red Barons hired two more managers, Gene Lamont and John Russell, who would go on to win the IL Manager of the Year Award in his only season as the team's manager, it was clear that the team needed a new direction, especially after losing to Rochester in the Governor Cup semifinals in four games. Following the 2006 season, the Philadelphia Phillies ended their affiliation with the Scranton/Wilkes-Barre Red Barons after 17 years.

=== Yankees affiliation ===
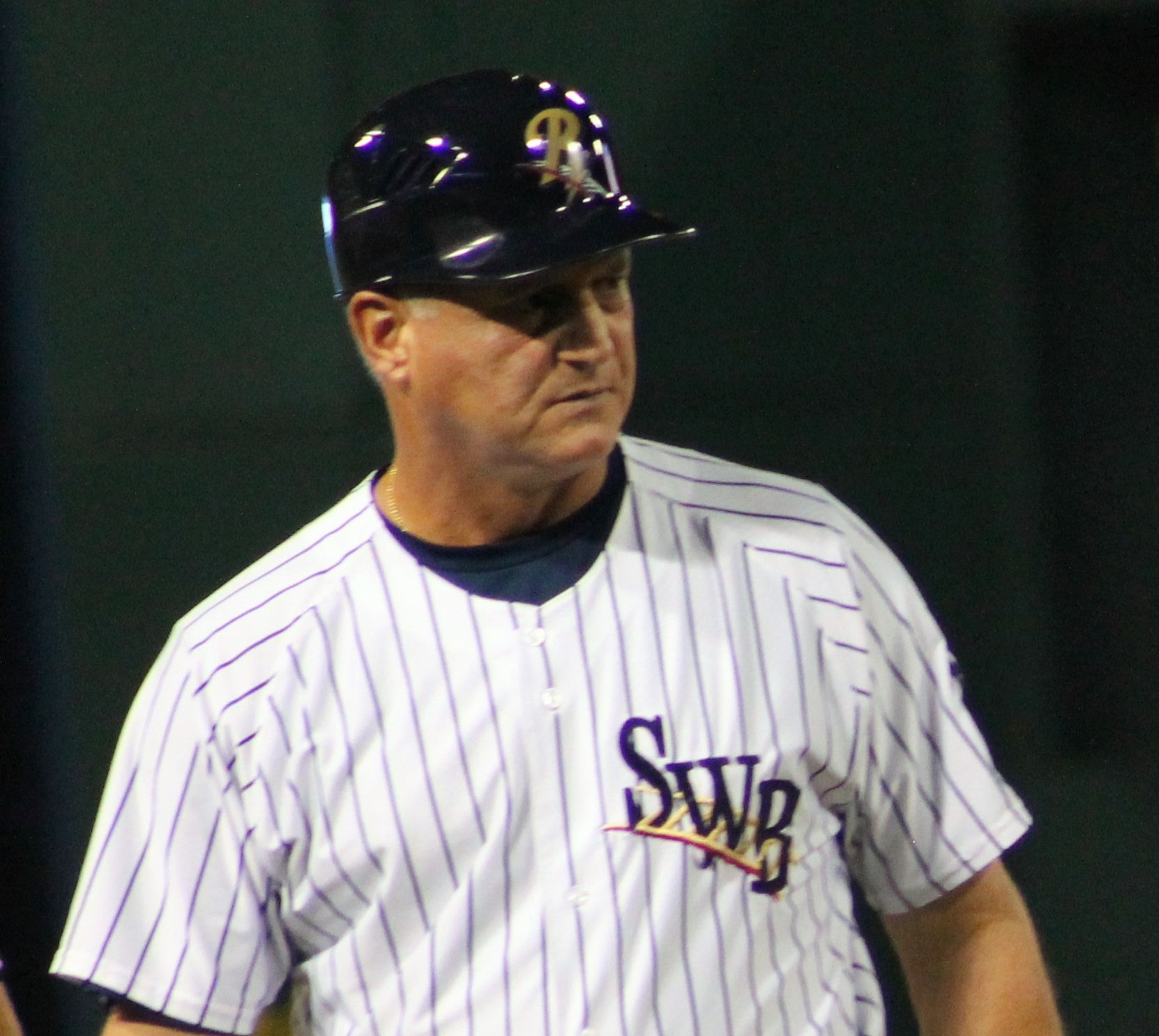
Al Pedrique managed the RailRiders from 2016 to 2017.

In 2007, Scranton/Wilkes-Barre became the Triple-A affiliate of the New York Yankees. After managing the Columbus Clippers, the Yankees' previous Triple-A affiliate, in 2006, Dave Miley was named the first manager of the newly rebranded Scranton/Wilkes-Barre Yankees. Miley, the longest-tenured manager in franchise history, won the International League Manager of the Year Award in both 2007 and 2012. During Miley's nine-season tenure, the team, which was renamed the RailRiders in 2012, won six division titles and one International League championship, securing the title in 2008. Miley amassed 726 wins in 1,316 games, the most by any manager in team history. On September 28, 2015, eleven days after being swept in three games by Indianapolis in the Governor's Cup semifinals, Miley and the Yankees parted ways. He finished his tenure one win shy of 1,900 career victories at the minor league level.

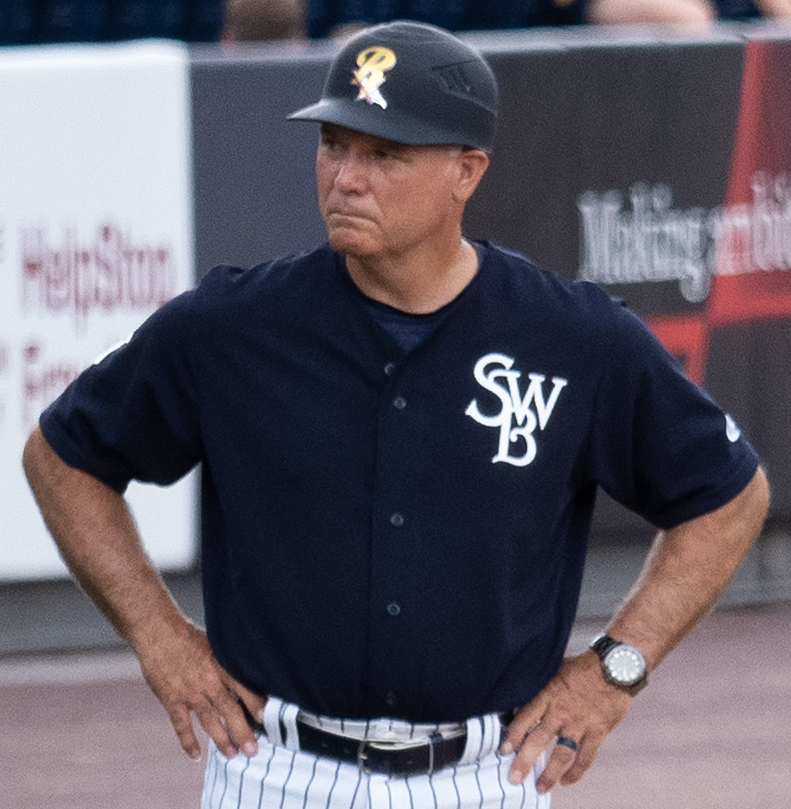
Doug Davis managed the RailRiders from 2020 to 2022.

On January 6, 2016, Al Pedrique was hired as the RailRiders' new manager. In his first season, the RailRiders matched a franchise-high 91 wins. This resulted in a Northern Division title as well as winning the International League Manager of the Year Award. In the postseason, the RailRiders posted a 6–1 record en route to the Triple-A National Championship Game. They swept their rivals, the Lehigh Valley IronPigs, in three games, defeated the Gwinnett Stripers in four games, and went on to win the championship by defeating the Pacific Coast League's El Paso Chihuahuas, 3–1, finishing the postseason with a 7–1 record. In Pedrique's 2017 campaign, the RailRiders finished 86–55, winning another Northern Division title. For their accomplishment, Pedrique once again took home Manager of the Year honors. In the postseason, the RailRiders defeated Lehigh Valley in the Governor Cup semifinals. However, they lost to the Durham Bulls in four games in the IL championship. Pedrique won 188 wins in 300 games, the fourth most by any manager in team history. He left the organization in the offseason uppn being hired by the Oakland Athletics as first base coach.

The RailRiders concluded the decade with two different managers: Bobby Mitchell (2018) and Jay Bell (2019). They recorded 73–65 and 76–65 records, respectively, with Mitchell taking the RailRiders to the IL championship for the third consecutive season. However, they were defeated by Durham for the second consecutive season.

In 2020, Doug Davis was initially hired to manage the team, but the season was cancelled due to the COVID-19 pandemic before it began. In conjunction with Major League Baseball's restructuring of Minor League Baseball in 2021, the RailRiders were placed in the new Triple-A East but remanined affiliated with the New York Yankees. Davis continued to serve as the RailRiders' manager until after the 2022 season. Before accepting an offer to become the Round Rock Express' manager, in 2023, Davis recorded 158 wins in 277 games managed in his two-year tenure, placing him sixth all-time in franchise wins.

In 2023, Shelley Duncan was appointed as the manager of the Scranton/Wilkes-Barre RailRiders. Before the hiring, he was the manager of the Jackson Generals in 2018, posting a 75–64 record. After leading the Yankees' Triple-A affiliate to an 89 win campaign, on January 24, 2025, the Yankees announced that Duncan would return as manager for 2025. In two seasons, Duncan has recorded 162 wins in 297 games, placing him fifth on the all-time wins list for RailRiders managers. After the 2026 season, he was hired to serve on the Boston Red Sox' coaching staff. In another offseason change, the RailRiders rebranded to become the Scranton/Wilkes-Barre Highlanders.

== Managers ==
No.	Manager	Season(s)
1	Bill Dancy	1989–1991
2	Lee Elia	1992
3	George Culver	1993
4	Mike Quade	1994–1995
5	Butch Hobson (Note: Ramón Avilés served as interim manager from May 6 through the end of the season after Butch Hobson took a leave of absence from the team.)	1996
6	Ramón Avilés	1996
7	Marc Bombard (Note: Marc Bombard was promoted to the Philadelphia Phillies to serve as interim third base coach on May 6. Red Barons hitting coach Jerry Martin served as interim manager for two days before being succeeded by Phillies field coordinator Bill Dancy and roving hitting instructor Donnie Long. Martin then came back as interim manager before Bombard returned to the team on July 14.)	1997–2001
8	Jerry Martin	2001
—	Bill Dancy	2001
9	Don Long	2001
—	Jerry Martin	2001
—	Marc Bombard	2001–2004
10	Gene Lamont	2005
11	John Russell	2006
12	Dave Miley	2007–2015
13	Al Pedrique	2016–2017
14	Bobby Mitchell	2018
15	Jay Bell	2019
16	Doug Davis	2020–2022
17	Shelley Duncan	2023–2026
18	TBD	from 2027
