= International League Manager of the Year Award =

- Sport: Baseball
- League: International League
- Awarded for: Best regular-season manager in the International League
- Country: United States; Canada
- Presented by: International League

History
- First award: Jack Tighe (1967)
- Most wins: Joe Altobelli (3); Rick Sweet (3)
- Most recent: Matthew LeCroy (2026)

The International League Manager of the Year Award is an annual award given to the best manager in Minor League Baseball's International League based on their regular-season performance as voted on by league managers. Broadcasters, Minor League Baseball executives, members of the media, coaches, and other representatives from the league's clubs have previously voted as well. Though the circuit was founded in 1884, it did not become known as the International League on a consistent basis until 1912. The first Manager of the Year Award was not issued until 1967. After the cancellation of the 2020 season, the league was known as the Triple-A East in 2021 before reverting to the International League name in 2022.

The only managers to win the award on three occasions are Joe Altobelli, who won in 1971, 1976, and 1980, and Rick Sweet, the winner in 2008, 2009, and 2022. Seven others have each won twice: Buddy Bailey, Eddie Haas, Dave Miley, Charlie Montoyo, Joe Morgan, Al Pedrique, and Jack Tighe. Tighe (1967 and 1968), Altobelli (1976 and 1977), Haas (1981 and 1982), Pedrique (2016 and 2017), and Sweet (2008 and 2009) won the award in consecutive years.

Eight managers from the Scranton/Wilkes-Barre Highlanders have been selected for the Manager of the Year Award, more than any other team in the league, followed by the Pawtucket Red Sox and Rochester Red Wings (7); the Norfolk Tides (6); the Syracuse Mets (5); the Buffalo Bisons (4); the Charleston Charlies, Durham Bulls, Richmond Braves, and Toledo Mud Hens (3); the Columbus Clippers and Louisville Bats (2); and the Charlotte Knights, Gwinnett Stripers, Lehigh Valley IronPigs, Memphis Blues, Nashville Sounds, Omaha Storm Chasers, and Ottawa Lynx (1).

Eight managers from the Baltimore Orioles Major League Baseball (MLB) organization have won the award, more than any other, followed by the Boston Red Sox and New York Yankees organizations (7); Cleveland Guardians and Philadelphia Phillies organizations (5); the Atlanta Braves, New York Mets, Toronto Blue Jays, and Washington Nationals organizations (4); the Detroit Tigers and Tampa Bay Rays organizations (3); the Cincinnati Reds organization (2); and the Chicago White Sox, Houston Astros, Kansas City Royals, Milwaukee Brewers, and Pittsburgh Pirates organizations (1).

== Winners ==
Jack Tighe won the first two International League Manager of the Year Awards (1967 and 1968).

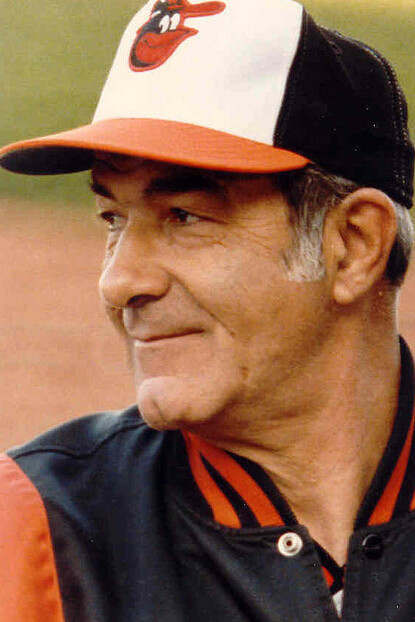
Joe Altobelli is the only manager to win the award three times (1971, 1976, and 1980).

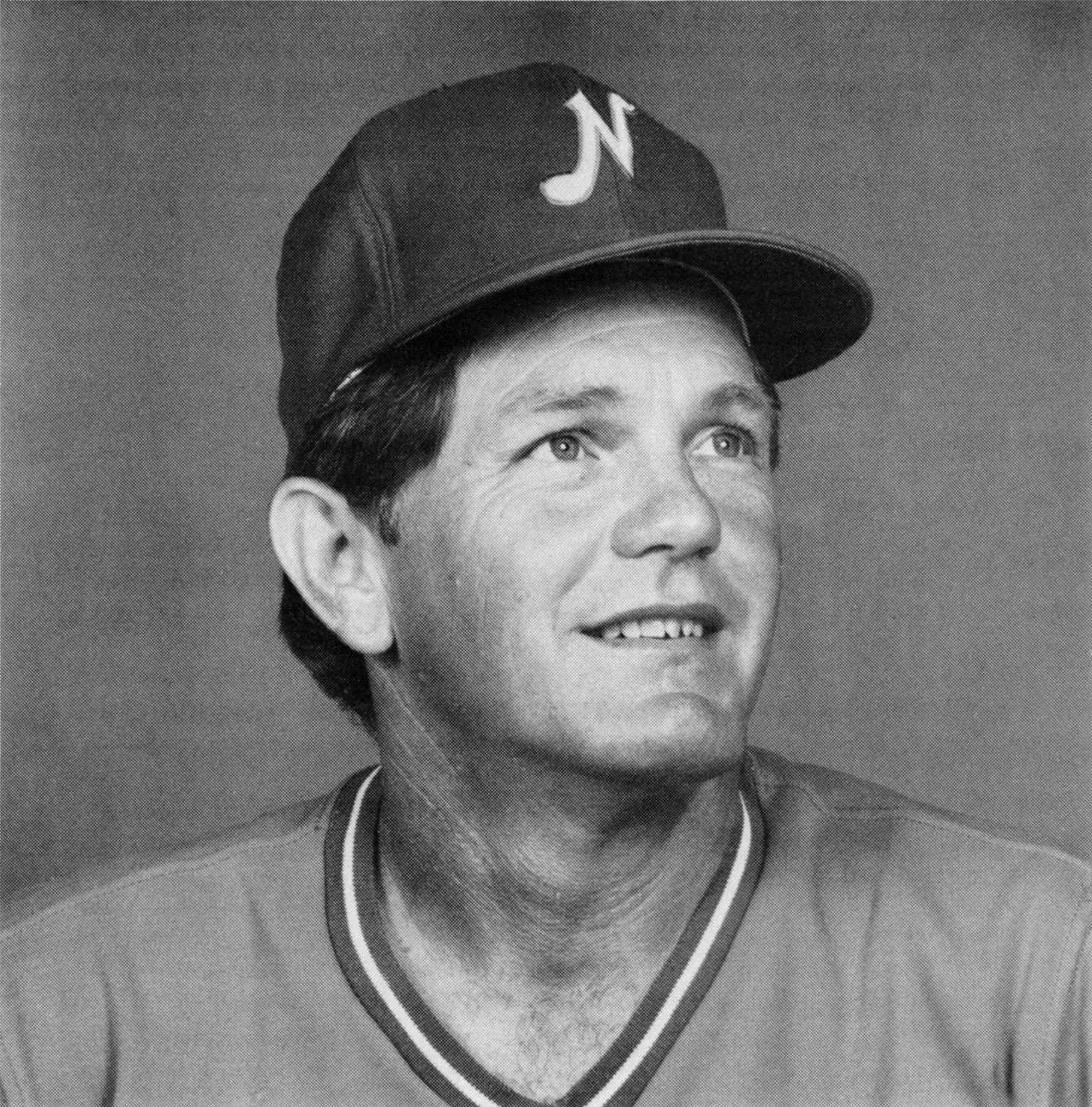
Johnny Oates, the 1988 winner, won the American League Manager of the Year Award in 1996.

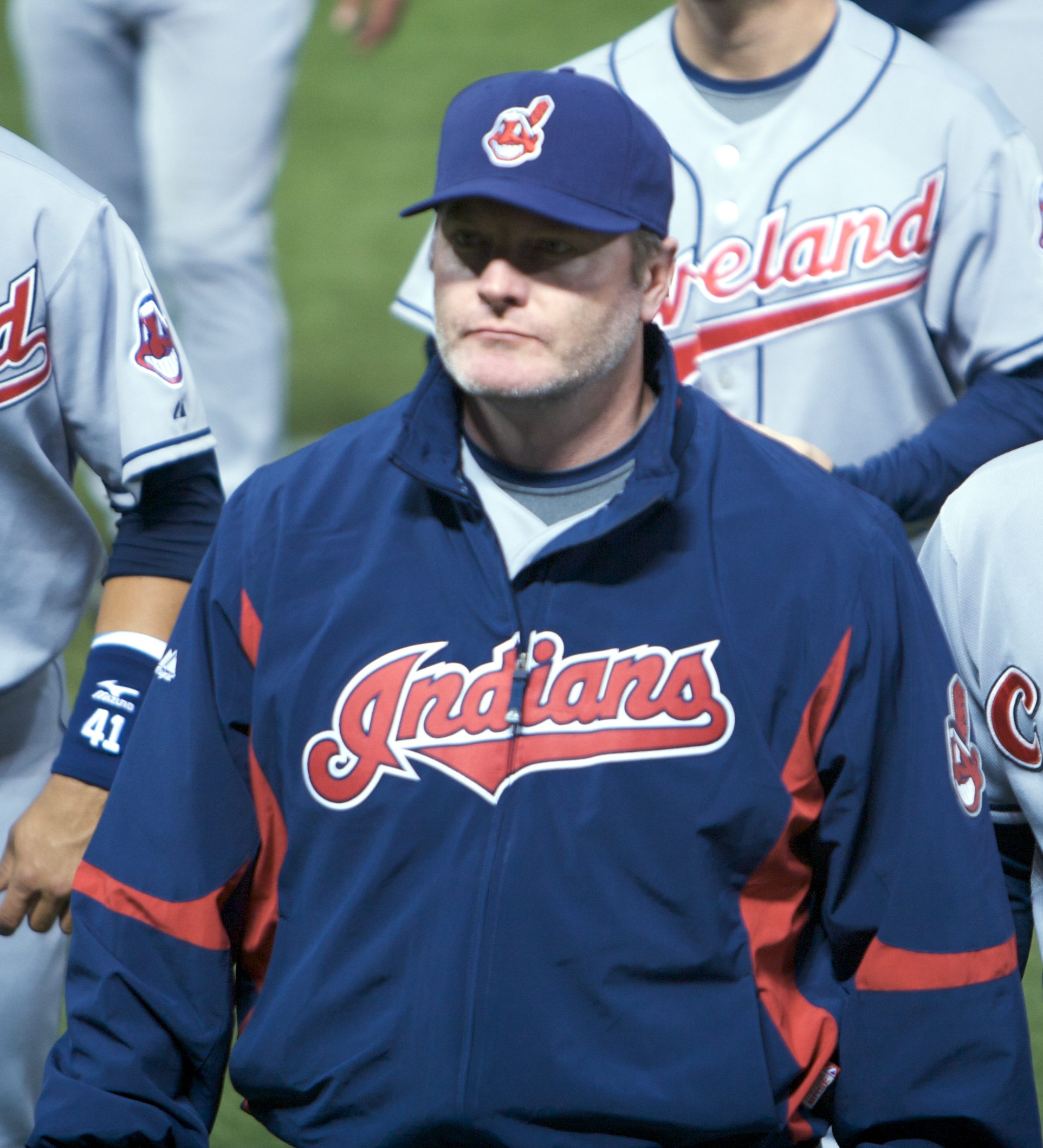
Eric Wedge, who won in 2001, was the American League Manager of the Year in 2007.

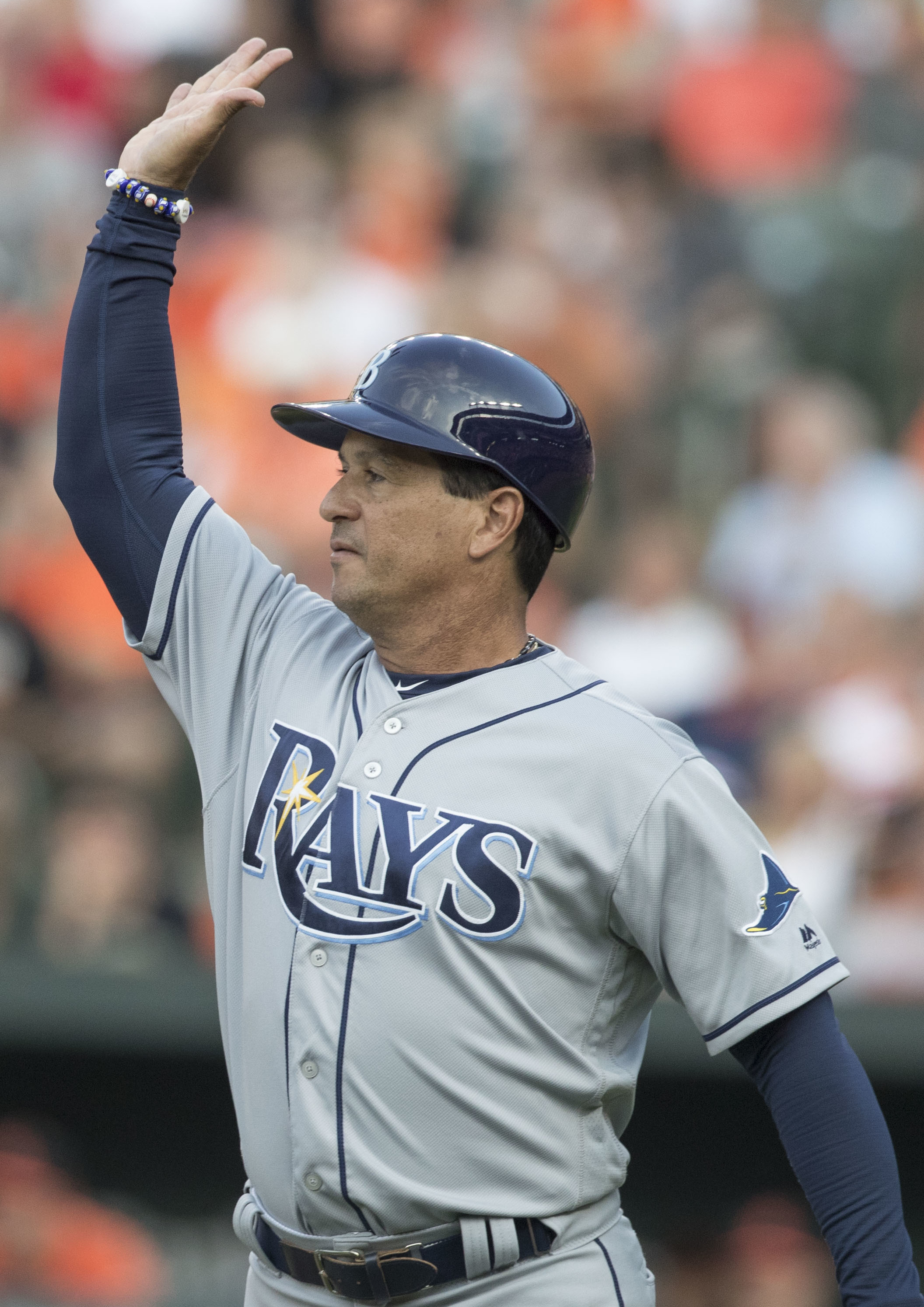
Charlie Montoyo, the 2010 and 2013 winner, was inducted into the International League Hall of Fame in 2016.

Key
| League | The team's final position in the league standings |
| Division | The team's final position in the divisional standings (Note: Positions are absent from seasons in which the league was not split into divisions.) |
| Record | The team's wins and losses during the regular season |
| (#) | Number of wins by managers who won the award multiple times |
| ^ | Indicates multiple award winners in the same year |
| * | Indicates league champions |

Winners
| Year | Winner | Team | Organization | League | Division | Record | Ref(s). |
|---|---|---|---|---|---|---|---|
| 1967 | Jack Tighe (1) | Toledo Mud Hens* | Detroit Tigers | 3rd | — | 73–66 | |
| 1968 | Jack Tighe (2) | Toledo Mud Hens | Detroit Tigers | 1st | — | 83–64 | |
| 1969 | Clyde McCullough | Tidewater Tides | New York Mets | 1st | — | 76–59 | |
| 1970 | Frank Verdi | Syracuse Chiefs* | New York Yankees | 1st | — | 84–56 | |
| 1971 | Joe Altobelli (1) | Rochester Red Wings* | Baltimore Orioles | 1st | — | 86–54 | |
| 1972 | Hank Bauer | Tidewater Tides* | New York Mets | 3rd | — | 78–65 | |
| 1973 | Joe Morgan (1) | Charleston Charlies | Pittsburgh Pirates | 1st | 1st | 85–60 | |
| 1974 | Karl Kuehl | Memphis Blues | Montreal Expos | 1st | 1st | 87–55 | |
| 1975 | Joe Frazier | Tidewater Tides* | New York Mets | 1st | — | 86–55 | |
| 1976 | Joe Altobelli (2) | Rochester Red Wings | Baltimore Orioles | 1st | — | 88–50 | |
| 1977 | Joe Morgan (2) | Pawtucket Red Sox | Boston Red Sox | 1st | — | 80–60 | |
| 1978 | Jim Beauchamp | Charleston Charlies | Houston Astros | 1st | — | 85–55 | |
| 1979 | Vern Benson | Syracuse Chiefs | Toronto Blue Jays | 2nd | — | 77–63 | |
| 1980 | Joe Altobelli (3) | Columbus Clippers* | New York Yankees | 1st | — | 83–57 | |
| 1981 | Eddie Haas (1) | Richmond Braves | Atlanta Braves | 2nd | — | 83–56 | |
| 1982 | Eddie Haas (2) | Richmond Braves | Atlanta Braves | 1st | — | 82–57 | |
| 1983 | Doc Edwards | Charleston Charlies | Cleveland Indians | 3rd | — | 74–66 | |
| 1984 | Tony Torchia | Pawtucket Red Sox* | Boston Red Sox | 4th | — | 75–65 | |
| 1985 | Doug Ault | Syracuse Chiefs | Toronto Blue Jays | 1st | — | 79–61 | |
| 1986 | John Hart | Rochester Red Wings | Baltimore Orioles | 2nd | — | 75–63 | |
| 1987 | Ed Nottle | Pawtucket Red Sox | Boston Red Sox | 4th | — | 73–67 | |
| 1988 | Johnny Oates | Rochester Red Wings* | Baltimore Orioles | 1st (tie) | 1st | 77–64 | |
| 1989 | Bob Bailor | Syracuse Chiefs | Toronto Blue Jays | 1st | 1st | 83–62 | |
| 1990 | Greg Biagini | Rochester Red Wings* | Baltimore Orioles | 1st | 1st | 89–56 | |
| 1991 | Butch Hobson | Pawtucket Red Sox | Boston Red Sox | 2nd | 1st | 79–64 | |
| 1992 | Lee Elia | Scranton/Wilkes-Barre Red Barons | Philadelphia Phillies | 2nd | 1st | 84–58 | |
| 1993 | Mike Quade | Ottawa Lynx | Montreal Expos | 5th | 2nd | 73–69 | |
| 1994 | Grady Little | Richmond Braves* | Atlanta Braves | 1st | 1st | 80–61 | |
| 1995 | Toby Harrah | Norfolk Tides | New York Mets | 1st | 1st | 86–56 | |
| 1996 | Buddy Bailey (1) | Pawtucket Red Sox | Boston Red Sox | 3rd | 1st | 78–64 | |
| 1997 | Marv Foley | Rochester Red Wings* | Baltimore Orioles | 1st | 1st | 83–58 | |
| 1998 | Ken Macha | Pawtucket Red Sox | Boston Red Sox | 4th | 3rd | 77–64 | |
| 1999 | Tom Spencer | Charlotte Knights* | Chicago White Sox | 3rd | 2nd | 82–62 | |
| 2000 | Joel Skinner | Buffalo Bisons | Cleveland Indians | 1st | 1st | 86–59 | |
| 2001 | Eric Wedge | Buffalo Bisons | Cleveland Indians | 1st | 1st | 91–51 | |
| 2002 | Marc Bombard | Scranton/Wilkes-Barre Red Barons | Philadelphia Phillies | 1st | 1st | 91–53 | |
| 2003 | Buddy Bailey (2) | Pawtucket Red Sox | Boston Red Sox | 1st | 1st | 83–61 | |
| 2004 | Marty Brown | Buffalo Bisons* | Cleveland Indians | 1st | 1st | 83–61 | |
| 2005 | Larry Parrish | Toledo Mud Hens* | Detroit Tigers | 1st | 1st | 89–55 | |
| 2006 | John Russell | Scranton/Wilkes-Barre Red Barons | Philadelphia Phillies | 1st | 1st | 84–58 | |
| 2007 | Dave Miley (1) | Scranton/Wilkes-Barre Yankees | New York Yankees | 1st | 1st | 84–59 | |
| 2008 | Rick Sweet (1) | Louisville Bats | Cincinnati Reds | 1st (tie) | 1st | 88–56 | |
| 2009 | Rick Sweet (2) | Louisville Bats | Cincinnati Reds | 1st | 1st | 84–58 | |
| 2010 | Charlie Montoyo (1) | Durham Bulls | Tampa Bay Rays | 1st | 1st | 88–55 | |
| 2011 | Mike Sarbaugh | Columbus Clippers* | Cleveland Indians | 1st | 1st | 88–56 | |
| 2012 | Dave Miley (2) | Scranton/Wilkes-Barre Yankees | New York Yankees | 2nd | 1st | 84–60 | |
| 2013 | Charlie Montoyo (2) | Durham Bulls* | Tampa Bay Rays | 1st | 1st | 87–57 | |
| 2014 | Billy Gardner Jr. | Syracuse Chiefs | Washington Nationals | 1st | 1st | 81–62 | |
| 2015 | Ron Johnson | Norfolk Tides | Baltimore Orioles | 4th | 1st | 78–66 | |
| 2016 | Al Pedrique (1) | Scranton/Wilkes-Barre RailRiders* | New York Yankees | 1st | 1st | 91–52 | |
| 2017 | Al Pedrique (2) | Scranton/Wilkes-Barre RailRiders | New York Yankees | 1st | 1st | 86–55 | |
| 2018 | Gary Jones | Lehigh Valley IronPigs | Philadelphia Phillies | 1st | 1st | 84–56 | |
| 2019 | Damon Berryhill | Gwinnett Stripers | Atlanta Braves | 2nd | 1st | 80–59 | |
| 2020 | None selected (season cancelled due to COVID-19 pandemic) | | | | | | |
| 2021^ | Casey Candaele | Buffalo Bisons | Toronto Blue Jays | 2nd | 1st | 79–47 | |
| 2021^ | Brady Williams | Durham Bulls* | Tampa Bay Rays | 1st | 1st | 86–44 | |
| 2022 | Rick Sweet (3) | Nashville Sounds | Milwaukee Brewers | 1st | 1st | 91–58 | |
| 2023 | Buck Britton | Norfolk Tides* | Baltimore Orioles | 1st | 1st | 90–59 | |
| 2024 | Mike Jirschele | Omaha Storm Chasers* | Kansas City Royals | 1st | 1st | 89–59 | |
| 2025 | Shelley Duncan | Scranton/Wilkes-Barre RailRiders | New York Yankees | 2nd | 2nd | 87–60 | |
| 2026 | Matthew LeCroy | Rochester Red Wings* | Washington Nationals | 1st | 1st | 90–58 | |

== Wins by team ==
Active International League teams appear in bold.

| Team | Award(s) | Year(s) |
|---|---|---|
| **Scranton/Wilkes-Barre Highlanders** (Scranton/Wilkes-Barre Red Barons/Yankees/RailRiders) | 8 | 1992, 2002, 2006, 2007, 2012, 2016, 2017, 2025 |
| Pawtucket Red Sox | 7 | 1977, 1984, 1987, 1991, 1996, 1998, 2003 |
| **Rochester Red Wings** | 7 | 1971, 1976, 1986, 1988, 1990, 1997, 2026 |
| **Norfolk Tides** (Tidewater Tides) | 6 | 1969, 1972, 1975, 1995, 2015, 2023 |
| **Syracuse Mets** (Syracuse Chiefs) | 5 | 1970, 1979, 1985, 1989, 2014 |
| **Buffalo Bisons** | 4 | 2000, 2001, 2004, 2021 |
| Charleston Charlies | 3 | 1973, 1978, 1983 |
| **Durham Bulls** | 3 | 2010, 2013, 2021 |
| Richmond Braves | 3 | 1981, 1982, 1994 |
| **Toledo Mud Hens** | 3 | 1967, 1968, 2005 |
| **Columbus Clippers** | 2 | 1980, 2011 |
| **Louisville Bats** | 2 | 2008, 2009 |
| **Charlotte Knights** | 1 | 1999 |
| **Gwinnett Stripers** | 1 | 2019 |
| **Lehigh Valley IronPigs** | 1 | 2018 |
| Memphis Blues | 1 | 1974 |
| **Nashville Sounds** | 1 | 2022 |
| **Omaha Storm Chasers** | 1 | 2024 |
| Ottawa Lynx | 1 | 1993 |

== Wins by organization ==
Active International League–Major League Baseball affiliations appear in bold.

| Organization | Award(s) | Year(s) |
|---|---|---|
| **Baltimore Orioles** | 8 | 1971, 1976, 1986, 1988, 1990, 1997, 2015, 2023 |
| **Boston Red Sox** | 7 | 1977, 1984, 1987, 1991, 1996, 1998, 2003 |
| **New York Yankees** | 7 | 1970, 1980, 2007, 2012, 2016, 2017, 2025 |
| **Cleveland Guardians** (Cleveland Indians) | 5 | 1983, 2000, 2001, 2004, 2011 |
| **Philadelphia Phillies** | 5 | 1992, 2002, 2006, 2018, 1973 |
| **Atlanta Braves** | 4 | 1981, 1982, 1994, 2019 |
| **New York Mets** | 4 | 1969, 1972, 1975, 1995 |
| **Toronto Blue Jays** | 4 | 1979, 1985, 1989, 2021 |
| **Washington Nationals** (Montreal Expos) | 4 | 1974, 1993, 2014, 2026 |
| **Detroit Tigers** | 3 | 1967. 1968, 2005 |
| **Tampa Bay Rays** | 3 | 2010, 2013, 2021 |
| **Cincinnati Reds** | 2 | 2008, 2009 |
| **Chicago White Sox** | 1 | 1999 |
| Houston Astros | 1 | 1978 |
| **Kansas City Royals** | 1 | 2024 |
| **Milwaukee Brewers** | 1 | 2022 |
