= Mike Quade =

American baseball coach and manager

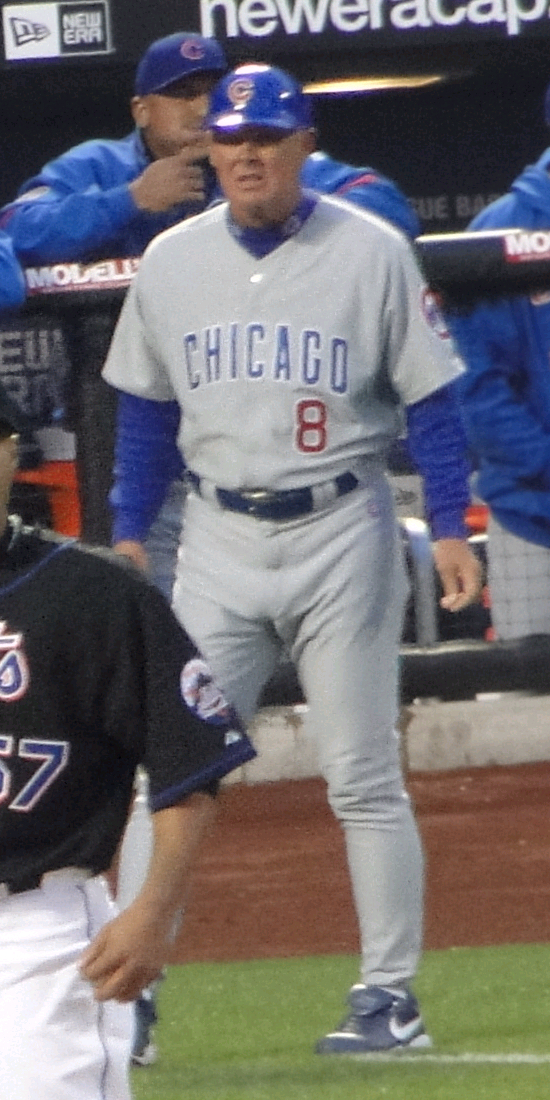
- Quade as third base coach for the Cubs in 2010
- Manager
- Born: March 12, 1957 (age 69); Evanston, Illinois, U.S.
- Bats: Right Throws: Right

MLB statistics
- Games managed: 199
- Win–loss record: 95–104
- Winning %: .477
- Stats at Baseball Reference
- Managerial record at Baseball Reference

Teams
- As manager: Chicago Cubs (2010–2011); As coach: Oakland Athletics (2000–2002); Chicago Cubs (2007–2010)

Gregory Michael Quade (pronounced: KWAH-dee) (born March 12, 1957) is an American professional baseball coach and manager. The manager of the Rochester Red Wings, Triple-A farm system affiliate of the Minnesota Twins of Major League Baseball from 2015 to 2017, Quade is currently the roving outfield coordinator in the Minnesota farm system. He had spent 2014 as a roving outfield and baserunning instructor for the New York Yankees' organization.

Quade played college baseball at the University of New Orleans and professionally in Minor League Baseball (MiLB) as an outfielder, third, and second baseman. He became a MiLB manager after he retired as a player. From 2000 through 2002, he served as a coach for the Oakland Athletics and coached the Cubs from 2007 through 2010. He took over as the Cubs' manager in 2010 and held the position through 2011.

== Playing career ==
Quade played college baseball at the University of New Orleans. He was named to the Sun Belt Conference "All-time baseball team" as part of the Conference's 30th anniversary celebration in January 2006.

Quade was selected by the Pittsburgh Pirates in the 22nd round (560th overall choice) of the 1979 Major League Baseball draft. He played for the Pirates' minor league system through 1983 at OF, 3B, 2B, and SS.

== Managerial career ==
After retiring as a player, Quade was named the manager of the Macon Pirates, who he managed in 1985 and 1986. He managed the Rockford Expos in 1989 and 1990, the Harrisburg Senators in 1991 and 1992, the Ottawa Lynx in 1993, the Scranton/Wilkes-Barre Red Barons in 1994 and 1995, the West Michigan Whitecaps in 1996, the Huntsville Stars in 1997, the Edmonton Trappers in 1998, the Vancouver Canadians in 1999, and the Iowa Cubs in 2003–06.

Quade was the Minor League Manager of the Year in 1991 with the Harrisburg Senators and in 1993 with the Ottawa Lynx. In 1997, he managed the West Michigan Whitecaps to a league championship and the Águilas Cibaeñas to win the Caribbean World Series. He managed the Vancouver Canadians to victory in the 1999 AAA World Series.

In November 1999, he managed a team of minor leaguers representing the United States to a fourth-place finish at the IBAF International Cup held in Sydney, Australia.

Quade also served as the first base coach of the Oakland Athletics between 2000 and 2002 and was on the Chicago Cubs bench staff during the 2003 playoff run.

Quade won his 1,000th game as a minor league manager on April 18, 2004. During July of the 2006 season, Quade substituted for then Cubs third base coach Chris Speier. Speier was out for three games of third base/coaching duties because of a DUI.

In October 2006, Quade was named one of the five finalists for the 2007 Chicago Cubs managerial opening. Quade, along with AA manager Pat Listach, were two Cubs minor league candidates interviewed for the job opening. Instead, Lou Piniella came out of retirement to accept the job. Quade was subsequently promoted to serve as the third base coach for the Cubs.

Quade was promoted to serve as interim manager of the Cubs after Piniella's sudden retirement on August 22, 2010. On October 19, the "interim" label was removed from his job title, and he was given a two-year contract with a club option for a third year to remain as manager of the Cubs. However, on November 2, 2011, Quade was terminated as manager by Theo Epstein, Cubs president of baseball operations.

In December 2013, the New York Yankees hired Quade as a roving outfield and baserunning instructor for the 2014 season. The following year, he was hired by the Minnesota Twins organization to serve as manager of the Triple-A Rochester Red Wings.. He served in the role for three seasons before shifting to a roving outfield instructor role in the organization in 2018.

== Managerial record ==
As of January 2, 2015

Team	From	To	Regular season record			Post–season record		
Team	From	To	W	L	Win %	W	L	Win %
Chicago Cubs	2010	2011	95	104	.477	0	0	–
Total			95	104	.477	0	0	–

== Personal ==
He is a 1975 graduate of Prospect High School in Mt. Prospect, Illinois. He attended the University of New Orleans (1976–1979). He was diagnosed with Alopecia universalis at age three.

Sporting positions
Preceded by Marc Bombard	Harrisburg Senators manager 1991–1992	Succeeded by Jim Tracy
Preceded by Franchise established	Ottawa Lynx manager 1993	Succeeded by Jim Tracy
Preceded by Lee Elia	Scranton/Wilkes-Barre Red Barons manager 1994–1995	Succeeded by Butch Hobson
Preceded by Dick Scott	Huntsville Stars manager 1997	Succeeded by Jeffrey Leonard
Preceded by Gary Jones	Edmonton Trappers manager 1998	Succeeded by Carney Lansford
Preceded by Mitch Seoane	Vancouver Canadians manager 1999	Succeeded by Dave Joppie
Preceded by Thad Bosley	Oakland Athletics first base coach 2000–2002	Succeeded by Brad Fischer
Preceded by Pat Listach	Iowa Cubs manager 2003–2006	Succeeded by Buddy Bailey
Preceded by Chris Speier; Chris Speier	Chicago Cubs third base coach 2006 (interim); 2007–2010	Succeeded by Chris Speier; Iván DeJesús
Preceded by Gene Glynn	Rochester Red Wings manager 2015–2017	Succeeded by Joel Skinner
