= Rick Sweet =

American baseball player and manager (born 1952)

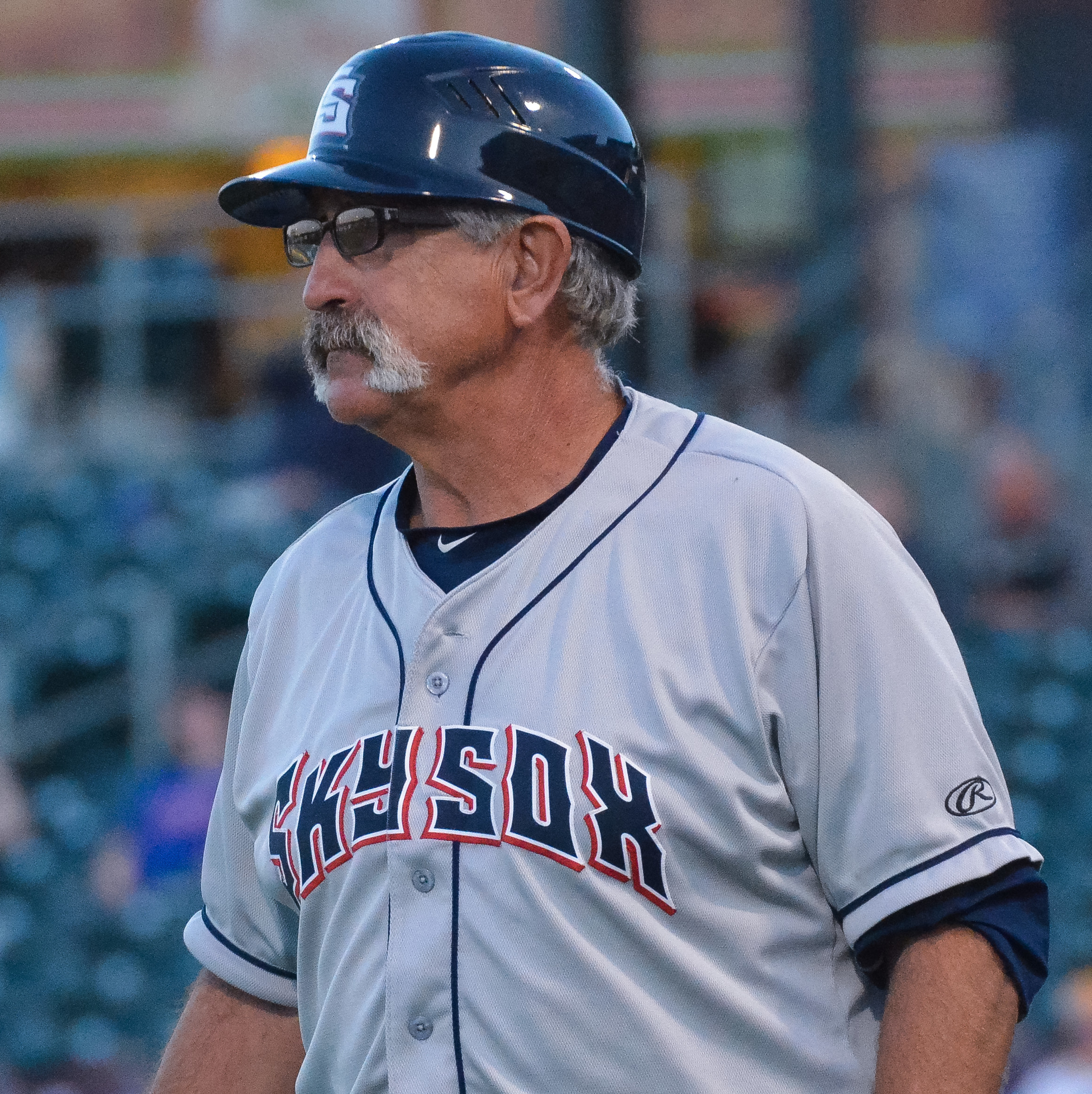
- Sweet as manager of the Colorado Springs Sky Sox in 2016
- Catcher
- Born: September 7, 1952 (age 73); Longview, Washington, U.S.
- Batted: Switch Threw: Right

MLB debut
- April 8, 1978, for the San Diego Padres

Last MLB appearance
- October 2, 1983, for the Seattle Mariners

MLB statistics
- Batting average: .234
- Home runs: 6
- Runs batted in: 57
- Stats at Baseball Reference

Teams
- San Diego Padres (1978); New York Mets (1982); Seattle Mariners (1982–1983)

Ricky Joe Sweet (born September 7, 1952) is an American former professional baseball catcher and current manager of the Milwaukee Brewers' Triple-A affiliate, the Nashville Sounds. He played three seasons in Major League Baseball (MLB) between 1978 and 1983 for the San Diego Padres, New York Mets, and Seattle Mariners. Sweet became a major league coach in 1984 and spent two years as a scout before beginning his minor league managerial career in 1987.

Sweet has won four minor league manager of the year awards. His first was the Pacific Coast League Manager of the Year Award in 1994 with the Tucson Toros. He has won the International League Manager of the Year Award three times. The first two were won back-to-back with the Louisville Bats in 2008 and 2009, while the third was won in 2022 with the Nashville Sounds. Sweet was the recipient of the Mike Coolbaugh Award in 2022.

== Early life ==
Rick Sweet was born on September 7, 1952, in Longview, Washington. After graduating from Mark Morris High School, he attended Gonzaga University, where he played college baseball for the Bulldogs from 1973 to 1975. Sweet served in the United States Marine Corps during the Vietnam War but never saw combat.

== Playing career ==
=== San Diego Padres (1975–1980) ===
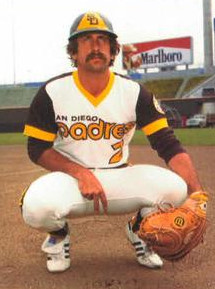
Sweet with the San Diego Padres in 1978

Sweet was drafted by the Pittsburgh Pirates in the 31st round of the 1974 Major League Baseball draft, but he elected not to sign and continued at Gonzaga. He was later selected in the third round of the secondary phase of the 1975 MLB draft by the San Diego Padres.

He began his professional career in 1975 with the Walla Walla Padres of the Class A Short Season Northwest League. Splitting his time between catcher and first base, Sweet led the league with a .350 batting average and 66 runs batted in (RBI). He was promoted to the Double-A Amarillo Gold Sox of the Texas League in 1976, primarily as a catcher. Sweet moved up to Triple-A in 1977 with the Pacific Coast League's Hawaii Islanders.

On April 8, 1978, Sweet made his major league debut as a pinch hitter versus the San Francisco Giants. Coming to bat in the fifth inning, he grounded out against Jim Barr in his only plate appearance. After three more games pinch hitting, he made his first major league start at catcher on April 19 against the Houston Astros. He recorded his first major league hit on April 13 against the Atlanta Braves' Dick Ruthven. Having split time behind the plate with Gene Tenace, he appeared in 88 games and accumulated a .221 batting average with 11 RBI by the season's end.

In 1979, San Diego replaced Sweet with Bill Fahey, who had been acquired from the Texas Rangers. Sweet spent the entirety of the 1979 and 1980 seasons at Triple-A Hawaii. While still primarily catching, he played about one third of the 1979 season at first base and one quarter of the 1980 campaign at third base.

=== New York Mets (1981–1982) ===
Sweet's contract was purchased by the New York Mets on December 15, 1980. He played the whole 1981 season with the Triple-A Tidewater Tides in the International League, catching two thirds of the time and playing nearly the rest at third base. Sweet made three major league pinch hit appearances for New York in April 1982.

=== Seattle Mariners (1982–1983) ===
The Seattle Mariners purchased Sweet's contract on May 21, 1982, and made him their starting catcher. Across the 1982 and 1983 seasons, he played more games behind the plate than any other Mariners' catcher, appearing in a total of 181 games, batting .238 with 46 RBI. Sweet was released by Seattle on March 23, 1984, following the offseason acquisition of catcher Bob Kearney from the Oakland Athletics. Rather than return to the minor leagues, Sweet elected to retire. He played his final game on October 2, 1983, in which he flew out versus the Chicago White Sox' Richard Dotson.

== Coaching and managerial career ==
After retiring as a player, Sweet was hired as the Mariners' bullpen coach for 1984. In 1985, he became an advance scout for Seattle. He remained in this position until June 1987, when he was given his first managerial post. Seattle made Sweet manager of their Class A Short Season Bellingham Mariners of the Northwest League in 1987. He was moved up to the Class A Wausau Timbers of the Midwest League in 1988.

Sweet left for the Houston Astros organization as manager of their Class A Osceola Astros of the Florida State League in 1989. He was promoted to the Double-A Southern League's Columbus Mudcats in 1990. The Astros moved their Double-A affiliation to the Jackson Generals the next season but retained Sweet as manager at that level for 1991 and 1992. He then spent three years managing their Triple-A Tucson Toros in the Pacific Coast League (PCL) from 1993 to 1995. Sweet led the 1993 Toros to win both halves of the season before defeating the Portland Beavers, four games to two, to win the PCL championship, his first league title. Though the 1994 team did not qualify for a return trip to the playoffs, Sweet was recognized as the PCL Manager of the Year. In 1996, Sweet was added to the Astros' major league coaching staff as first base coach under manager Terry Collins. After one season, he was let go along with Collins.

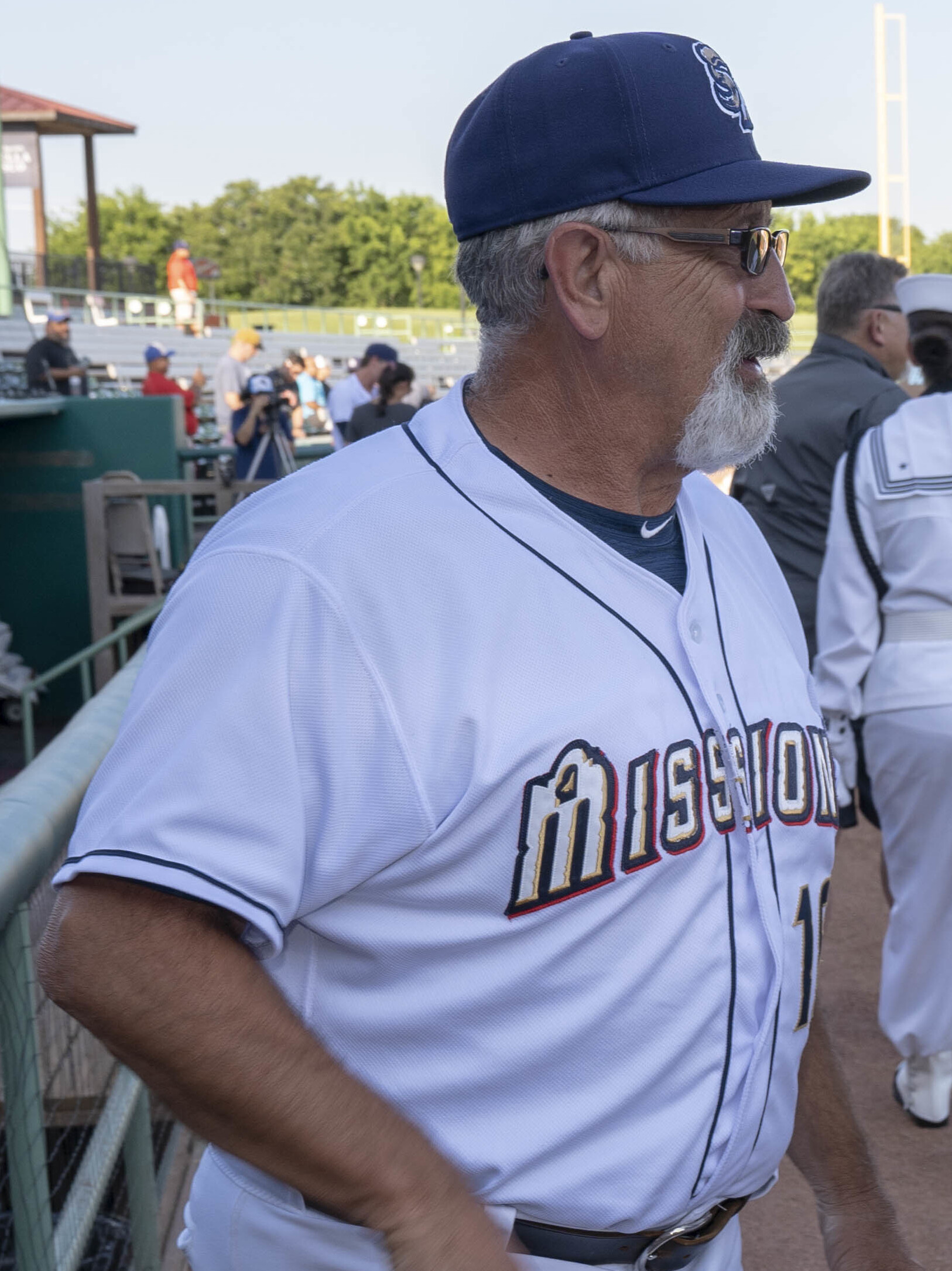
Sweet managing the San Antonio Missions in 2019

Sweet landed in the New York Mets organization for 1997 managing the Double-A Binghamton Mets in the Eastern League. He was hired by the Montreal Expos to manage their Harrisburg Senators, also of the Eastern League, in 1998. The team won the Eastern League championship over the New Britain Rock Cats, 3–1. Sweet led the team to win a second league crown in 1999 with a 3–2 defeat of the Norwich Navigators. He was promoted to the Triple-A Ottawa Lynx of the International League in 2000. He next managed the San Diego Padres' Triple-A Portland Beavers in the PCL from 2001 to 2003 and the Detroit Tigers' Double-A Erie SeaWolves in the Eastern League in 2004.

Sweet was hired by the Cincinnati Reds to manage their Triple-A Louisville Bats of the International League in 2005, where he remained for seven seasons through 2011. He led the team to win three consecutive Western Division titles from 2008 to 2010, but they were eliminated in the first round each time. Sweet won back-to-back International League Manager of the Year Awards in 2008 and 2009. From 2012 to 2013, he served as a roving catching instructor in the Reds' system.

Sweet joined the Milwaukee Brewers organization in 2014 as manager of the Triple-A Nashville Sounds in the PCL. He continued to manage their top farm team over the next six seasons as they switched affiliations to the PCL's Colorado Springs Sky Sox from 2015 to 2018 and San Antonio Missions from 2019 to 2020. The Brewers reaffiliated with Nashville in 2021 with Sweet returning to lead the Sounds in the Triple-A East, which became known again as the International League in 2022. Sweet led the 2022 Sounds to a league-best 91–58 record and won the IL Manager of the Year Award for a third time. He was chosen for the 2022 Mike Coolbaugh Award in recognition for his "outstanding baseball work ethic, knowledge of the game, and skill in mentoring young players on the field."
