= Doug Davis (infielder) =

American baseball player (born 1962)

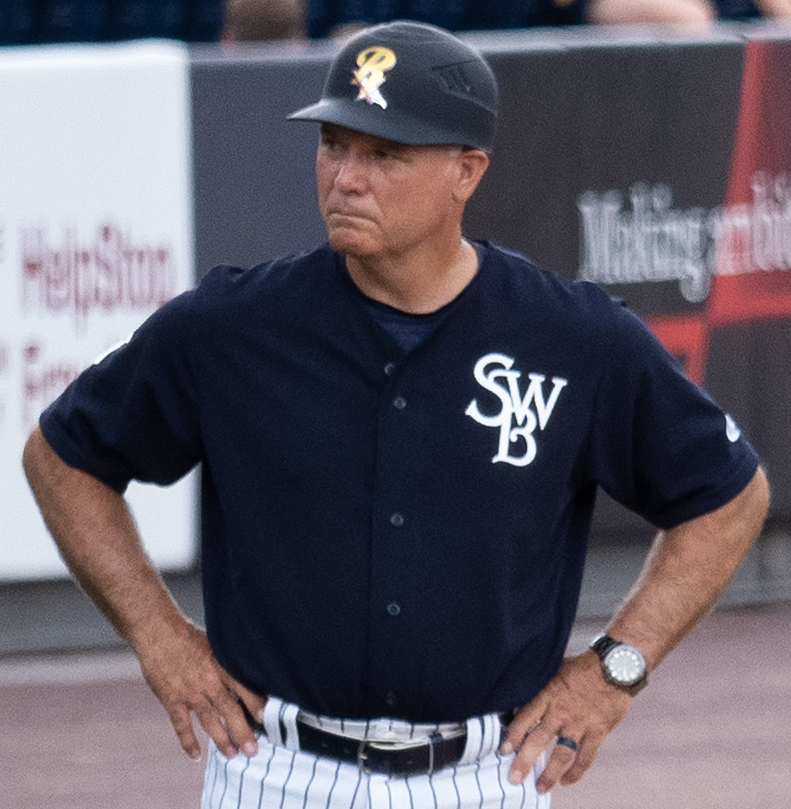
- Davis with the Scranton/Wilkes-Barre RailRiders in 2022

Salt Lake Bees
- Third baseman / Catcher / Coach
- Born: September 24, 1962 (age 63); Bloomsburg, Pennsylvania, U.S.
- Batted: Right Threw: Right

MLB debut
- July 8, 1988, for the California Angels

Last MLB appearance
- April 23, 1992, for the Texas Rangers

MLB statistics
- Batting average: .077
- Home runs: 0
- Runs batted in: 0
- Stats at Baseball Reference

Teams
- As player: California Angels (1988); Texas Rangers (1992); As coach: Florida Marlins (2003–2004)

Douglas Raymond Davis (born September 24, 1962) is an American former professional baseball player and coach. Davis is currently the manager of the Salt Lake Bees, the Triple-A affiliate of the Los Angeles Angels. During his playing career, he appeared in seven games over two seasons as a catcher and third baseman for the Angels and Texas Rangers of Major League Baseball (MLB).

== Playing career ==
Davis attended North Carolina State University, where he played college baseball for the Wolfpack from 1982 to 1984.

He was drafted by the California Angels in the ninth round of the 1984 Major League Baseball draft. He made his professional debut that same year with the Single-A Peoria Chiefs. He spent the 1985 season with the Double-A Midland Angels where he batted .258 with six home runs and 29 RBIs in 79 games. He spent the next two seasons with Midland before being promoted to the Triple-A Edmonton Trappers ahead of the 1988 season. In 79 games with Edmonton, Davis slashed .257/.335/.310 with one home run.

On July 8, 1988, Davis made his major league debut for the Angels. He arrived at Cleveland Municipal Stadium in Cleveland, Ohio, just an hour before the start of the game. Not originally in the lineup, Davis entered the game as a pinch runner for third baseman Jack Howell, who was hit by a pitch in the top of fourth inning. Davis remained in Howell’s spot, assuming his duties at third base despite not playing third in the minors. His unorthodox debut was capped off by a bench-clearing brawl after Indians’ pitcher Bud Black hit Devon White with a pitch. Davis appeared in six games for the Angels in 1988, going hitless in 12 at-bats.

Davis returned to the minor leagues where he spent the next three seasons in the Angels and Kansas City Royals minor league organizations.

In 1992, Davis split his season between the Double-A Tulsa Drillers and the Triple-A Oklahoma City 89ers in the Texas Rangers organization. In April 23, he appeared in his first and only game for the Rangers as a defensive replacement in the top of the ninth inning for catcher Ivan Rodriguez. In the bottom of the ninth, Davis recorded his first career hit, a single off pitcher John Doherty.

Davis spent the 1993, 1994 and 1995 seasons in the minor leagues. He was a replacement player with the Angels in spring training in 1995 during the ongoing players' strike. After the strike ended, he became a coach with their Single-A affiliate.

== Coaching and managing career ==
In 1996, Davis was named the manager of the Pittsfield Mets of the New York–Penn League. In just his second season as manager, Davis led Pittsfield to a 42–32 record and the league championship. By 1999, he had been promoted to manage the Double-A Binghamton Mets.

Davis was the bench coach of the Florida Marlins in 2003 and 2004.

He spent the 2007 and 2008 seasons as manager of the Toronto Blue Jays' Triple-A affiliate, the Syracuse Chiefs of the International League. He was the Blue Jays' Minor League Field Coordinator until 2016. He was the defensive coach for the New York Yankees Triple-A affiliate Scranton/Wilkes-Barre Railriders until 2020. On January 27, 2020, he was named manager of the Railriders. Prior to the 2023 season, Davis was named the manager of the Texas Rangers Triple-A affiliate Round Rock Express. In his first season with the team, Davis led the Express to an 89–60 record and a Pacific Coast League championship birth. The team lost the championship series to the Oklahoma City Dodgers.

On January 21, 2026, Davis was named the manager of the Salt Lake Bees, the triple-A affiliate of the Los Angeles Angels.
