= Dave Miley =

American baseball player and manager

- Manager
- Born: April 3, 1962 (age 64); Tampa, Florida, U.S.
- Bats: Left Throws: Right

MLB statistics
- Games managed: 289
- Win–loss record: 125–164
- Winning %: .433
- Stats at Baseball Reference
- Managerial record at Baseball Reference

Teams
- As manager: Cincinnati Reds (2003–2005)

David Allen Miley (born April 3, 1962) is an American former baseball player and manager.

== Playing career ==
Miley was born in Tampa, Florida, and attended George D. Chamberlain High School in Tampa, graduating in 1980. He was drafted by the Cincinnati Reds in the second round of the 1980 Major League Baseball draft out of high school. Miley played in the minor leagues in the Reds organization from 1980 to 1987, without making it to the Major Leagues.

== Managerial career ==
From 1988 through 2002, Miley managed in the Reds minor league system. In 1988, Miley managed the Greensboro Hornets of the South Atlantic League. In 1989 and 1990, he managed the Cedar Rapids Reds of the Midwest League. In 1991, he managed the Charleston Wheelers of the South Atlantic League. In 1992, he managed the Nashville Sounds of the American Association. He served as the bench coach for the Reds in 1993. In 1995, he managed the Chattanooga Lookouts of the Southern League. From 1996 to 1999, he managed the Indianapolis Indians of the American Association and International League. From 2000 to 2003, he managed the Louisville Bats of the International League, winning the Governor's Cup Championship in 2001.

Miley managed the Reds from 2003 to 2005. In his three seasons as manager, the Reds compiled a 125–164 record. He was fired halfway through the 2005 season and replaced by Jerry Narron.

Miley joined the New York Yankees organization in 2006, managing the Columbus Clippers. He remained with the Yankees when they moved their Triple-A affiliation, managing the Scranton/Wilkes-Barre Yankees.

Miley won International League Manager of the Year in the 2007 season and again for the 2012 season. In 2008, Miley led the Scranton/Wilkes-Barre Yankees to their first Governor's Cup Championship.

Miley was the manager of the Indios de Mayagüez of the Puerto Rico Baseball League during the League's 2011–2012 season.

== Managerial records ==
Team	Year	Regular Season				Post Season			
Team	Year	Won	Lost	Win %	Finish	Won	Lost	Win %	Result
CIN	2003	22	35	.386	5th in NL Central	—	—	—	—
CIN	2004	76	86	.469	4th in NL Central	—	—	—	—
CIN	2005	31	51	.386	6th in NL Central	—	—	—	—
Total	–	125	164	.433	—	—	—	—	—
