= Marc Bombard =

American professional baseball coach

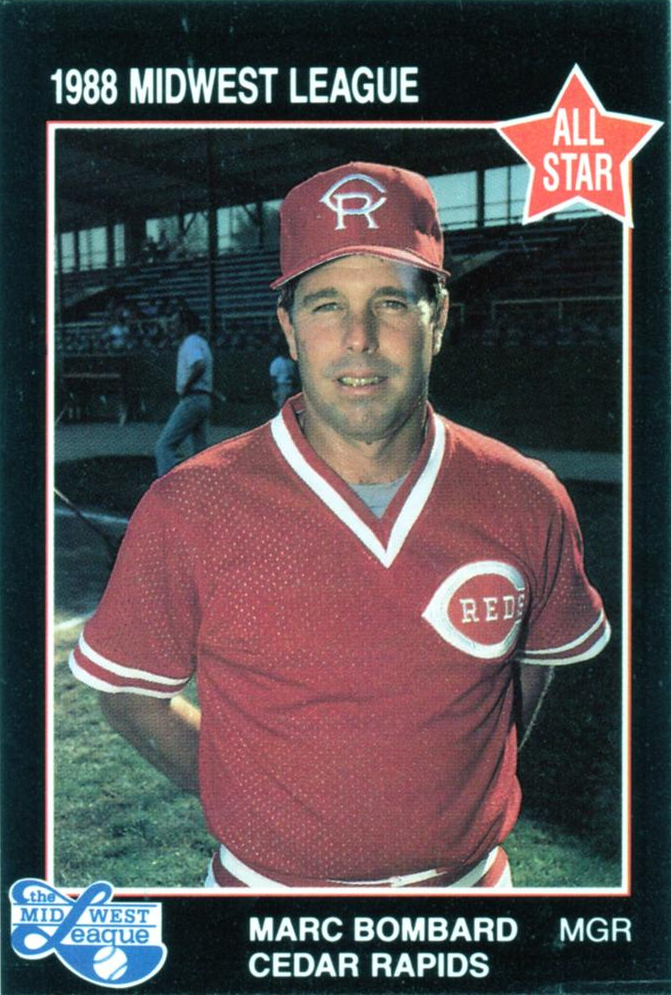
- Bombard with the Cedar Rapids Reds c. 1988
- Coach / Pitcher
- Born: November 15, 1949 (age 77); Tampa, Florida, U.S.
- Bats: Switch Throws: Left
- Stats at Baseball Reference

Marc Stephen Bombard (born November 15, 1949) is an American professional baseball manager and coach, and a former pitcher in minor league baseball. A manager in the minors for 28 years, he spent three seasons in the Major Leagues as the third-base coach of the Cincinnati Reds in 1996 and first-base coach of the Philadelphia Phillies in 2005–06.

During his active career, Bombard pitched in the Cincinnati organization from 1971 to 1977. A left-hander, he was listed as 5 feet 8 inches (1.73 m) tall and 180 pounds (82 kg). At one point, his roommate was "Macho Man" Randy Savage.

In 1978, he became a minor league manager and coach for the Reds. After short careers in the Milwaukee Brewers and Pittsburgh Pirates organizations (and manager of the minor league Buffalo Bisons in 1992), he returned to the Reds as manager of the minor league Indianapolis Indians from 1993 to 1995. In 1996, Bombard served as the Reds' third base coach under skipper Ray Knight. He joined the Phillies' organization the following year and managed the Scranton/Wilkes-Barre Red Barons of the International League for eight seasons, and was named the league's Manager of the Year for 2002. He became Phillies first base coach in 2005. Bombard was let go by the Phillies following the 2006 season.

Bombard was replaced by former Milwaukee Brewers manager and Los Angeles Dodgers infielder Davey Lopes.

Bombard was named the manager of the Round Rock Express on December 3, 2008. The Express are the Triple A minor league affiliate of the Houston Astros. He managed the Express for the next two seasons. He spent 2016 and 2017 as manager of one of the New York Yankees' Gulf Coast Yankees squads in the Rookie-level Gulf Coast League.

Bombard was elected to the International League Hall of Fame in 2015. Bombard was elected to the Florida State League Hall of Fame in 2016.

Preceded by Ray Knight	Cincinnati Reds third base coach 1996	Succeeded by Joel Youngblood
Preceded by Milt Thompson	Philadelphia Phillies first base coach 2005–2006	Succeeded by Davey Lopes
