= Scranton/Wilkes-Barre Highlanders =

Minor League Baseball team

- Founded in 1989; Moosic, Pennsylvania

Team logo	Cap insignia

Minor league affiliations
- Class: Triple-A (1989–present)
- League: International League (1989–present)
- Division: East Division

Major league affiliations
- Team: New York Yankees (2007–present)
- Previous teams: Philadelphia Phillies (1989–2006)

Minor league titles
- Class titles (1): 2016
- League titles (2): 2008; 2016
- Division titles (13): 1992; 1999; 2002; 2006; 2007; 2008; 2009; 2010; 2012; 2015; 2016; 2017; 2019
- Second-half titles (1): 2025
- Wild card berths (3): 2000; 2001; 2018

Team data
- Name: Scranton/Wilkes-Barre Highlanders (2027–present)
- Previous names: Scranton/Wilkes-Barre RailRiders (2013–2026); Empire State Yankees (2012); Scranton/Wilkes-Barre Yankees (2007–2011); Scranton/Wilkes-Barre Red Barons (1989–2006)
- Colors: Navy blue, light blue, forest green, tan, gray, white
- Mascot: CHAMP
- Ballpark: PNC Field (2013–present)
- Previous parks: Multiple locations (2012); PNC Field (1989–2011)
- Owner/ Operator: Diamond Baseball Holdings
- General manager: Shawn Reilly
- Manager: Vacant
- Website: milb.com/scranton-wb

The Scranton/Wilkes-Barre Highlanders are a Minor League Baseball team of the International League (IL) and the Triple-A affiliate of the New York Yankees. They are located in Moosic, Pennsylvania, in the Scranton/Wilkes-Barre area, and are named after the New York Highlanders, the original name of the Yankees.

Founded as members of the International League in 1989, the team was known as the Scranton/Wilkes-Barre Red Barons during their affiliation with the Philadelphia Phillies from 1989 to 2006. They became known as the Scranton/Wilkes-Barre Yankees in 2007 after affiliating with the New York Yankees. They rebranded as the Scranton/Wilkes-Barre RailRiders in 2013. The RailRiders became members of the Triple-A East in 2021, but this league was renamed the International League in 2022. The name was changed to the Highlanders after the 2026 season.

Scranton/Wilkes-Barre has won two International League championships (2008 and 2016) and one Triple-A National Championship (2016).

== History ==
=== Prior professional baseball in the Scranton/Wilkes-Barre area ===
Professional baseball teams first played in the Scranton/Wilkes-Barre (SWB) area of Pennsylvania in the late 19th century. In Scranton, the predominant moniker of these teams was the Scranton Miners, who originated in 1886 as the Scranton Indians, though they were also known as Coal Heavers and Red Sox throughout their history. The Miners' last season was in 1953 as members of the Eastern League. The franchise was surrendered to the league after it was unable to secure backing by a Major League Baseball team for 1954. In Wilkes-Barre, the Wilkes-Barre Barons, originally the Coal Barons, who were established in 1886, played their last season in the Eastern League in 1955. Financial problems resulted in the relocation of the franchise to Johnstown during the 1955 season.

=== Scranton/Wilkes-Barre Red Barons (1989–2006) ===
Over three decades after Minor League Baseball left the Scranton/Wilkes-Barre area, the Maine Phillies were relocated from Old Orchard Beach, Maine, to Lackawanna County in 1989. A group from Scranton, called Northeast Baseball, Inc. (NBI), purchased the team in 1987. The previous owner tried to renege on the sale, but after a lengthy court battle, NBI won control of the franchise and moved forward with its relocation. The team was renamed the Scranton/Wilkes-Barre Red Barons in reference to the Scranton Red Sox and the Wilkes-Barre Barons, who had preceded them. They were to play in the International League (IL) as the Triple-A affiliate of the Philadelphia Phillies, as had the franchise in Maine. Their home ballpark was the newly constructed Lackawanna County Stadium, later renamed PNC Field, located in nearby Moosic, Pennsylvania.

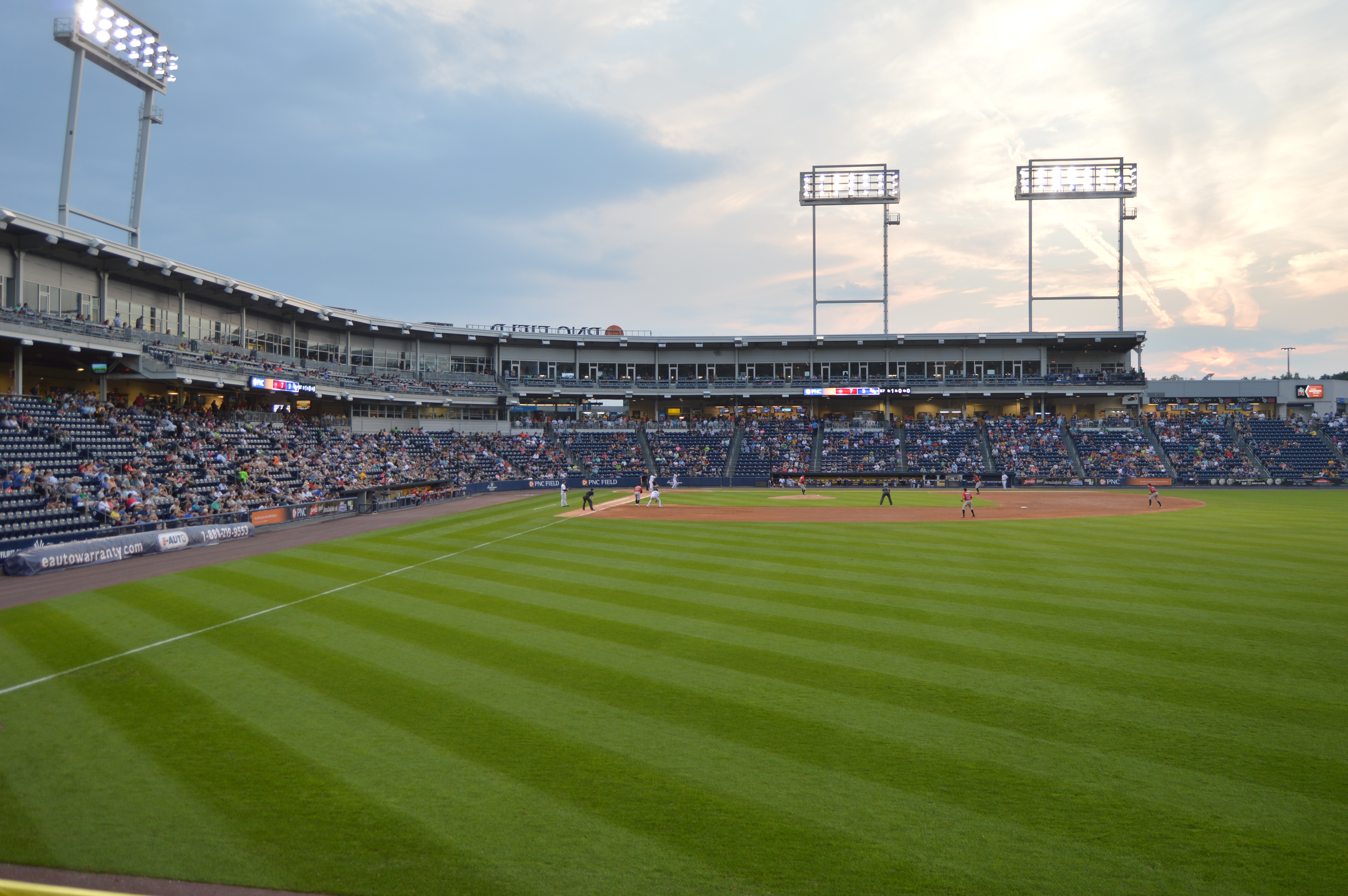
Scranton/Wilkes-Barre has played at PNC Field, formerly Lackawanna County Stadium, since 1989.

The Red Barons struggled in their early years, finishing under .500 in their first three seasons. In 1992, manager Lee Elia led SWB to an 84–58 record and the Eastern Division title. In the playoffs, they defeated the Pawtucket Red Sox in the semifinals but lost the league championship versus the Columbus Clippers. The Red Barons posted losing records for the next six seasons.

Marc Bombard took over as manager in 1997 and led the club to four consecutive postseason appearances from 1999 to 2002. The 1999 Northern Division champion Red Barons were eliminated from the playoffs in the semifinals by the Charlotte Knights. In 2000, the team missed winning the division but qualified for the IL wild card spot. They defeated the Buffalo Bisons in the semifinals but fell to the Indianapolis Indians in the championship round. Another wild card berth in 2001 sent SWB back to the playoffs. They won the semifinals over Buffalo, 3–2, and advanced to face the Louisville RiverBats for the league title. After losing Game One of the series, the postseason came to abrupt end when it was cancelled in the wake of the September 11 terrorist attacks. Louisville, with a 1–0 series lead, was declared the champion. The Red Barons returned to the playoffs in 2002 with the Northern Division title but were eliminated by Buffalo in the semifinals. They made one more postseason appearance as the Red Barons and as a Phillies affiliate in 2006 via a division title win, but the Rochester Red Wings ended their championship hopes in the semifinals.

Following the 2006 season, the Philadelphia Phillies ended their affiliation with the Red Barons and signed a player development contract with the Ottawa Lynx in anticipation of that team's move to Allentown's new Coca-Cola Park as the Lehigh Valley IronPigs for the 2008 season.

=== Scranton/Wilkes-Barre Yankees (2007–2012) ===
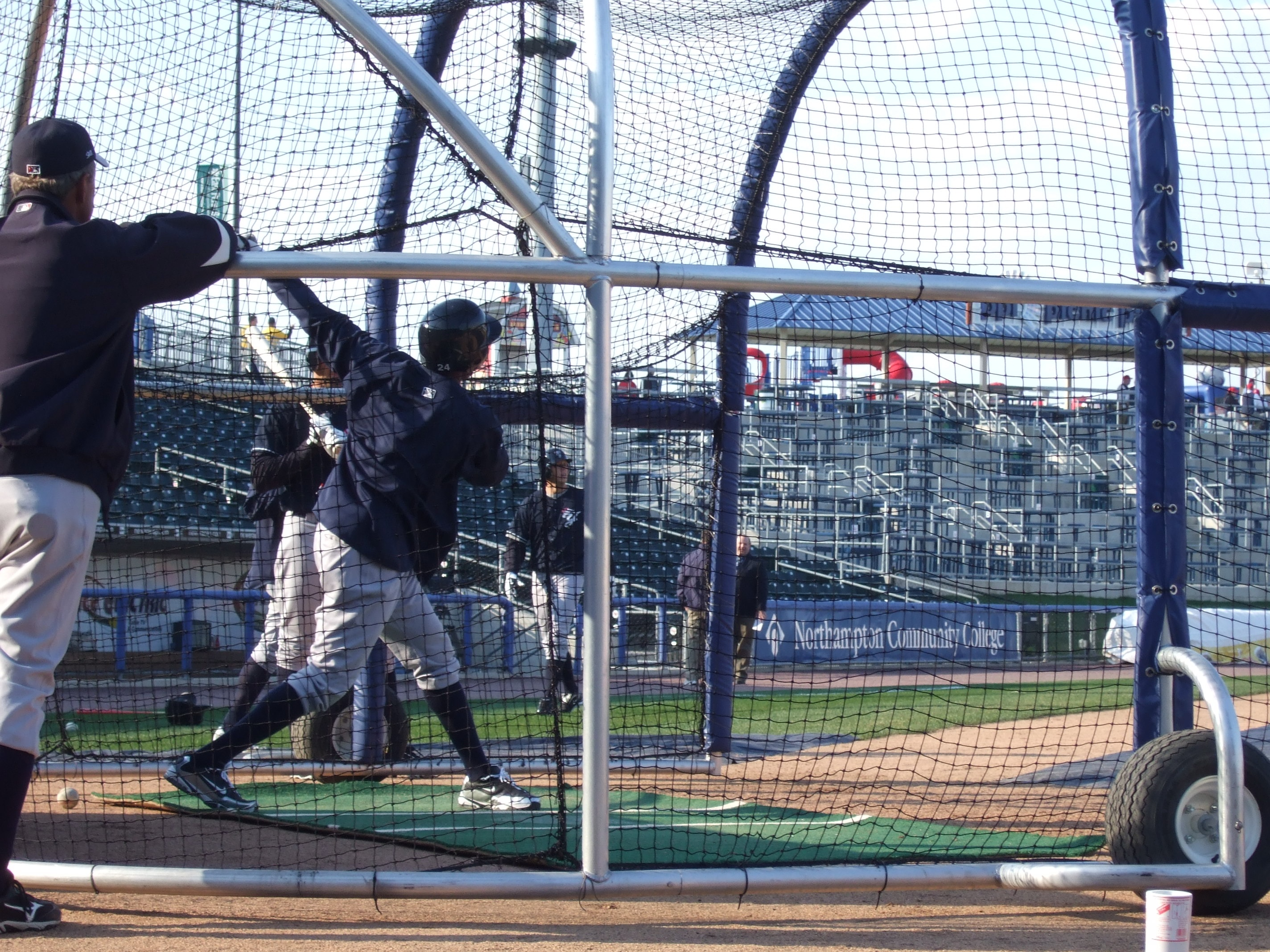
The SWB Yankees taking batting practice before a game in 2009

In 2007, the club became the Triple-A affiliate of the New York Yankees and rebranded as the Scranton/Wilkes-Barre Yankees. In terms of regular-season records and championships, the Yankees affiliation has been more successful than that with the Phillies. From 2007 to 2009, the SWB Yankees made four consecutive trips to the postseason, all by virtue of winning the Northern Division title. The 2007 team was eliminated in the semifinal round by the Richmond Braves. In 2008, the Yankees won another division title with an 88–56 record behind manager Dave Miley. After defeating Pawtucket in the semifinals, 3–1, the Yankees beat the Durham Bulls, 3–1, in the final round to earn the Governors' Cup, their first IL championship. This qualified them for the Bricktown Showdown, a single game against the Pacific Coast League's champion to determine an overall champion of the Triple-A classification. They lost the Triple-A championship versus the Sacramento River Cats by a score of 4–1. SWB won the 2009 semifinals over the Gwinnett Braves, 3–1, but were swept by Durham in the finals, 3–0. The 2010 team was eliminated by Columbus in the semifinals.

In November 2010, the Lackawanna County Multipurpose Stadium Authority voted to sell the SWB Yankees to Mandalay Baseball Properties, which planned a $40-million renovation of PNC Field. However, negotiations stalled the actual sale for over a year. The sale was finalized on April 26, 2012, with the franchise being sold to SWB Yankees LLC, an ownership entity that was a joint venture between the New York Yankees and Mandalay.

==== Empire State Yankees ====
The SWB Yankees chose to temporarily relocate their operations for the 2012 season to allow major renovations to PNC Field to be completed in one season, rather than being spread over two to three years. The team based itself in Rochester, New York, at Frontier Field, home of Red Wings. They played their entire schedule on the road, often being designated as the home team at an opponent's ballpark. In addition to Frontier Field, the Yankees also played home games at Dwyer Stadium in Batavia, New York; Alliance Bank Stadium in Syracuse, New York; Coca-Cola Field in Buffalo, New York; Coca-Cola Park in Allentown, Pennsylvania; and McCoy Stadium in Pawtucket, Rhode Island. The team was known as the Empire State Yankees in the 2012 season for promotional purposes, though it retained its official SWB Yankees moniker. After missing the playoffs in 2011, the Yankees returned in 2012 by winning the Northern Division title, but they were eliminated by Pawtucket in the semifinals.

=== Scranton/Wilkes-Barre RailRiders (2013–2026) ===
In anticipation of their return to the renovated PNC Field in 2013, a name-the-team contest was launched to select a new moniker for the SWB franchise. Among the finalists were "Blast", "Black Diamond Bears", "Fireflies", "Porcupines", and "Trolley Frogs". The chosen name, "RailRiders", is in reference to Northeastern Pennsylvania being home to the first trolley system in the United States. Although RailRiders, which was submitted by local resident Chuck Parente, received the most first-place votes by fans, Porcupines received the most overall fan votes on the ballots ranked one through three. As a result, a porcupine was incorporated in the RailRiders' logos.

The 2013 and 2014 RailRiders finished under .500 and did not qualify for the postseason. In September 2014, Mandalay Baseball Properties sold its 50% interest in the team to SWB Investors LLC, a group consisting of David Abrams, David Blitzer, Grant Cagle, and Michael Hisler, for approximately $14 million. The RailRiders returned to the playoffs in 2015 with a Northern Division title win, but they were swept out of the semifinals by Indianapolis. After nine seasons, six division titles, and one league championship, the 2015 season was the last for Dave Miley as the team's manager.

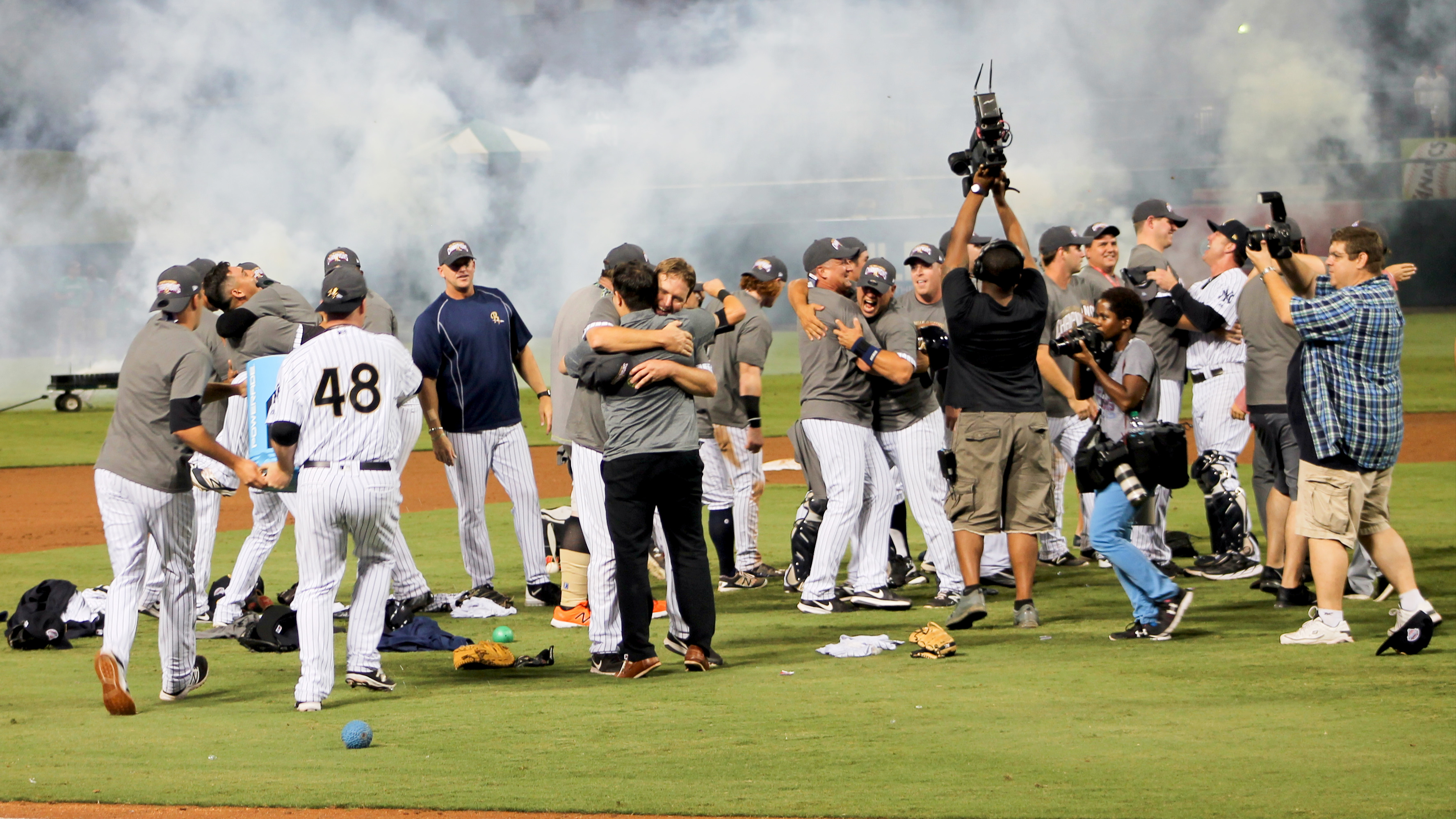
The RailRiders celebrating winning the 2016 Triple-A National Championship Game

Al Pedrique was hired to lead the team in 2016. SWB finished with a league-best 91–52 record and another Northern Division title. They swept Lehigh Valley, 3–0, in the semifinals and won their second Governors' Cup over Gwinnett, 3–1. The IL championship qualified them for the Triple-A National Championship Game versus the El Paso Chihuahuas, where they won, 3–1, claiming their second Triple-A championship.

The 2017 RailRiders won the division title and defeated Lehigh Valley in the semifinals but lost the IL championship to Durham. The 2018 club made another postseason run via a wild card berth. Like in the previous season, they advanced to the finals by beating Lehigh Valley but again lost in the finals to Durham. The RailRiders finished the 2019 season tied for first place with the Syracuse Mets, each with a 75–65 record. On September 3, SWB defeated Syracuse in a one-game playoff, 14–13, to win the Northern Division title. They were, however, swept in the playoff semifinals by Durham.

The start of the 2020 season was initially postponed due to the COVID-19 pandemic before being cancelled altogether.

In conjunction with Major League Baseball's restructuring of Minor League Baseball in 2021, the RailRiders were organized into the Triple-A East. No playoffs were held to determine a league champion; instead, the team with the best regular-season record was declared the winner. SWB placed third in the league standings with a 68–49 record under manager Doug Davis, who had been with the club as a coach since 2017. However, 10 games that had been postponed from the start of the season were reinserted into the schedule as a postseason tournament called the Triple-A Final Stretch in which all 30 Triple-A clubs competed for the highest winning percentage. The RailRiders finished the tournament in sixth place with a 7–3 record.

In December 2021, SWB Investors sold their 50% stake in the club to Diamond Baseball Holdings. In 2022, the Triple-A East became known as the International League, the name historically used by the regional circuit prior to the 2021 reorganization. Davis returned to the club for his second season as manager, leading the team to an 83–67 record, finishing second in the ten-team East Division.

=== Scranton/Wilkes-Barre Highlanders (2027–present) ===
On November 7, 2026, the team rebranded as the Scranton/Wilkes-Barre Highlanders. The new moniker is a reference to the New York Yankees originally being known as the Highlanders from 1903 to 1912, while their new logos incorporate Yankees imagery with that of camping and outdoors recreation, which are important to the region.

== Season-by-season records ==
Season-by-season records (last five seasons)
Season	League	Regular-season					Postseason			MLB affiliate	Ref.
Season	League	Record	Win %	League	Division	GB	Record	Win %	Result	MLB affiliate	Ref.
2022	IL	83–67	.553	5th	2nd	3	—	—	Result	—	New York Yankees
2023	IL	73–75	.493	10th	6th	16 1/2	—	—	—	New York Yankees	
2024	IL	89–60	.597	2nd	1st	—	—	—	—	New York Yankees	
2025	IL	87–60	.592	2nd	2nd	1/2	1–2	.333	Won second-half title Lost IL championship vs. Jacksonville Jumbo Shrimp, 2–1	New York Yankees	
2026	IL	78–68	.534	7th	4th	11	—	—	—	New York Yankees	
Totals	—	410–330	.554	—	—	—	1–2	.333	—	—	—

== Uniforms ==
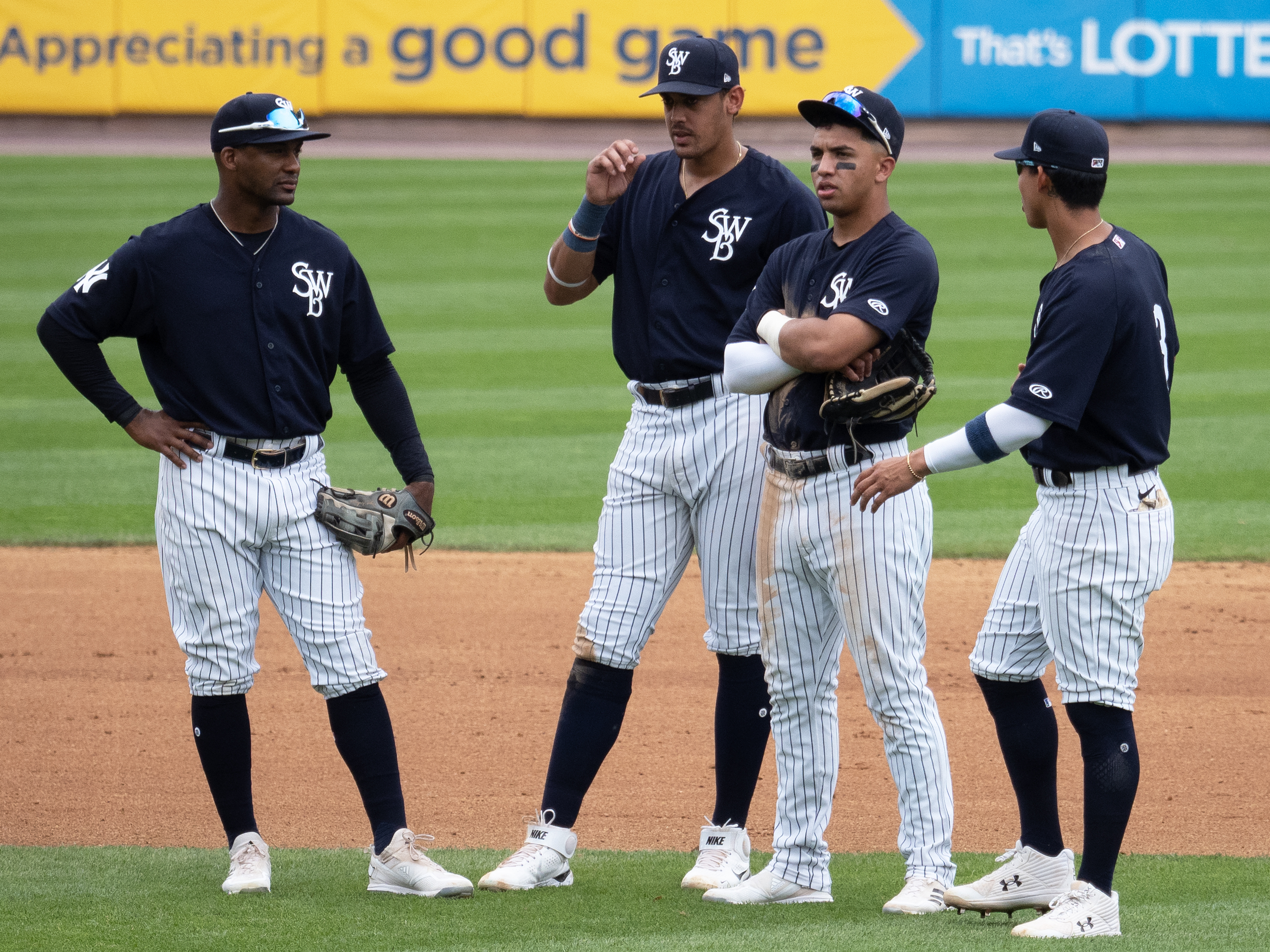
RailRiders players wearing alternate navy blue jerseys and pinstriped pants

The RailRiders' primary home uniform is white with navy blue pinstripes, mirroring those of the New York Yankees. The primary home jersey features a descending "SWB" logo on train tracks on the left chest and a navy interlocking New York Yankees "NY" logo on the right sleeve. The home cap is navy with a golden "R" set against a railroad track. The team's road uniform is gray with "RailRiders" across the jersey's chest and is worn with a navy cap with a white interlocking "SWB" logo.

An alternate solid navy jersey was introduced in 2022, featuring the white interlocking "SWB" crest on the left chest and a white interlocking New York Yankees "NY" logo on the right sleeve. These are worn with the navy cap feature the same "SWB" logo.

== Radio and television ==
SWB's first radio play-by-play announcer was Kent Westling, a former local television sportscaster who previously worked on telecasts of the St. Louis Blues hockey team. While cutting back on his schedule in later years, he retired following the 2007 season after having called over 2,000 games since the team's inaugural 1989 campaign. Mike Vander Woude served as the team's second play-by-play announcer from 2008 until 2012. He was followed by John Sadak from 2013 to 2017. Adam Marco has been the "Voice of the RailRiders" since 2018.

After several years with WICK and its translators, the Highlanders switched radio rights to Times-Shamrock Media-owned "Fuzz 96.1" based at WEZX-HD3. Live audio broadcasts are also available online through the team's website and the MiLB First Pitch app. All home and road games can be viewed through the MiLB.TV subscription feature of the official website of Minor League Baseball, with audio provided by a radio simulcast.

== Roster ==
Scranton/Wilkes-Barre Highlanders roster
Players		Coaches/Other
Pitchers: 39 Will Brian; 38 Carson Coleman; -- Luis García; 16 Brian Hendry; 41 Chris Kean; 40 Carlos Lagrange; 19 Hayden Merda; 29 Zach Messinger; 28 Eric Reyzelman; 33 Xavier Rivas; 31 Danny Watson	Catchers: 21 Edinson Duran; 12 Christian Rodriguez *; Infielders: 36 Tyler Hardman; 6 Connor McGinnis; Outfielders: 41 Garrett Martin; 30 Max Schuemann *	Manager: Vacant; Coaches: 47 Raul Dominguez (defense); 88 Pete Larson (bullpen); 28 Michael Mergenthaler (hitting); 56 Spencer Medick (pitching); 45 Gil Velazquez (bench); 7-day injured list; * On New York Yankees 40-man roster; ~ Development list; # Rehab assignment; ∞ Reserve list; ‡ Restricted list; § Suspended list; † Temporarily inactive list; Roster updated November 2, 2026; Transactions; → More rosters: MiLB • International League; → New York Yankees minor league players

== Achievements ==
=== Awards ===
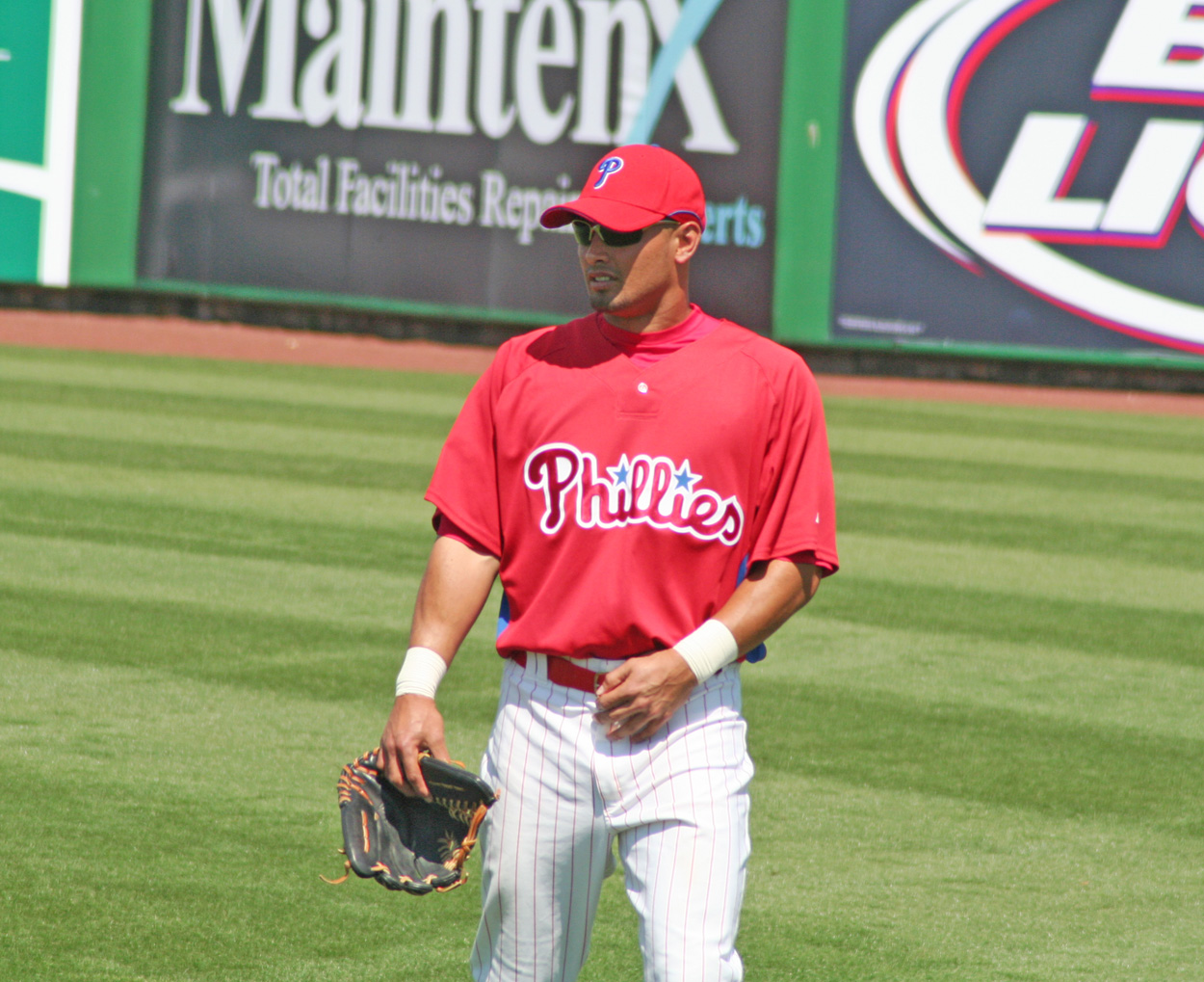
Shane Victorino, 2005 International League MVP

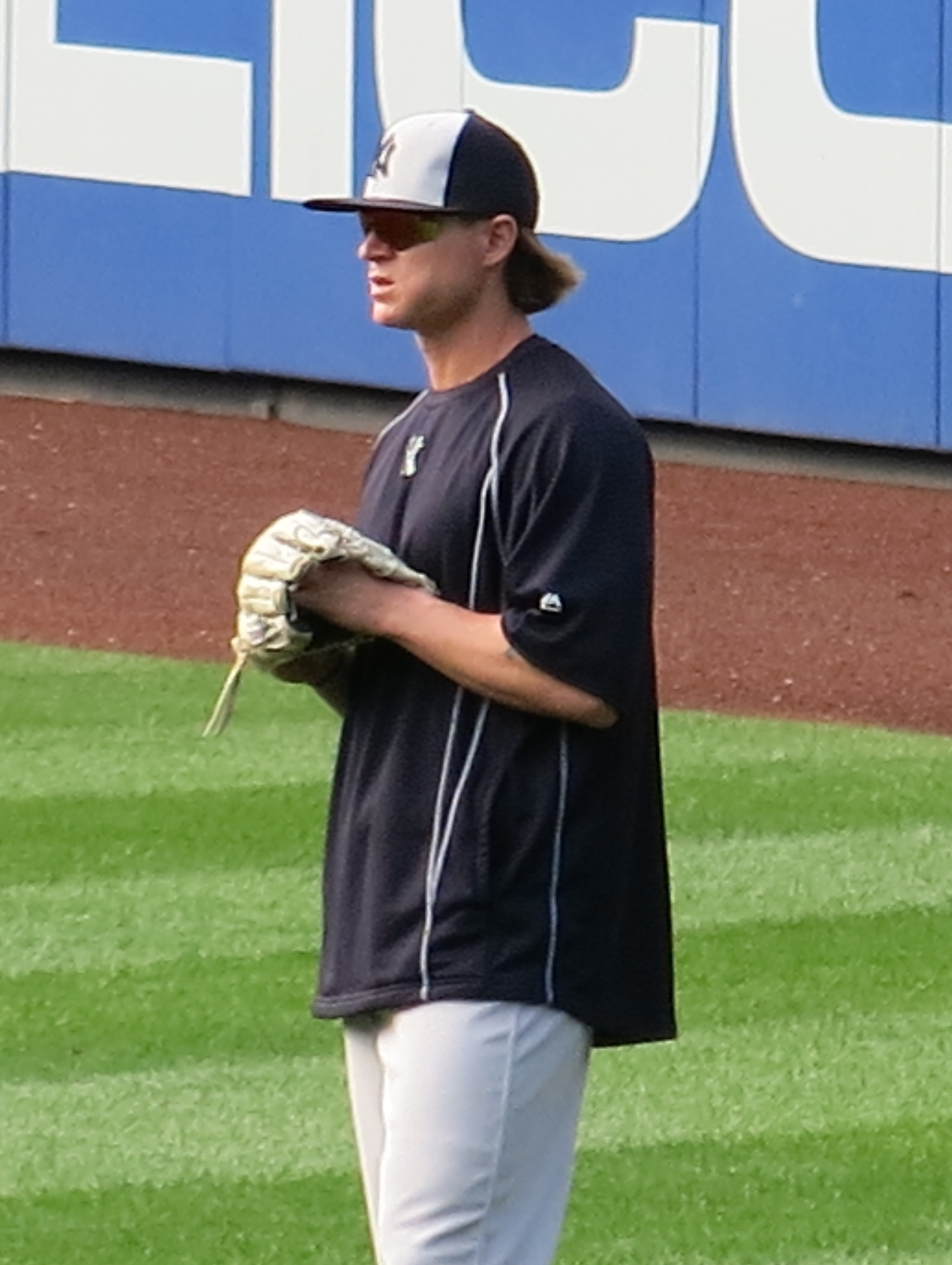
Ben Gamel, 2015 IL Rookie of the Year and 2016 IL MVP

Eight players, six managers, and two executives have won league awards in recognition for their performance with Scranton/Wilkes-Barre in the International League.

International League awards
Award	Recipient	Season	Ref.
Most Valuable Player	Shane Victorino	2005	
Most Valuable Player	Shelley Duncan	2009	
Most Valuable Player	Ben Gamel	2016	
Most Valuable Pitcher	Brandon Duckworth	2001	
Most Valuable Pitcher	Joe Roa	2002	
Pitcher of the Year Award	Greg Weissert	2022	
Rookie of the Year	Marlon Anderson	1998	
Rookie of the Year	Brandon Duckworth	2001	
Rookie of the Year	Austin Jackson	2009	
Rookie of the Year	Ben Gamel	2015	
Manager of the Year	Lee Elia	1992	
Manager of the Year	Marc Bombard	2002	
Manager of the Year	John Russell	2006	
Manager of the Year	Dave Miley	2007	
Manager of the Year	Dave Miley	2012	
Manager of the Year	Al Pedrique	2016	
Manager of the Year	Al Pedrique	2017	
Manager of the Year	Shelley Duncan	2025	
Executive of the Year	Bill Terlecky	1990	
Executive of the Year	Josh Olerud	2017	

=== Retired numbers ===
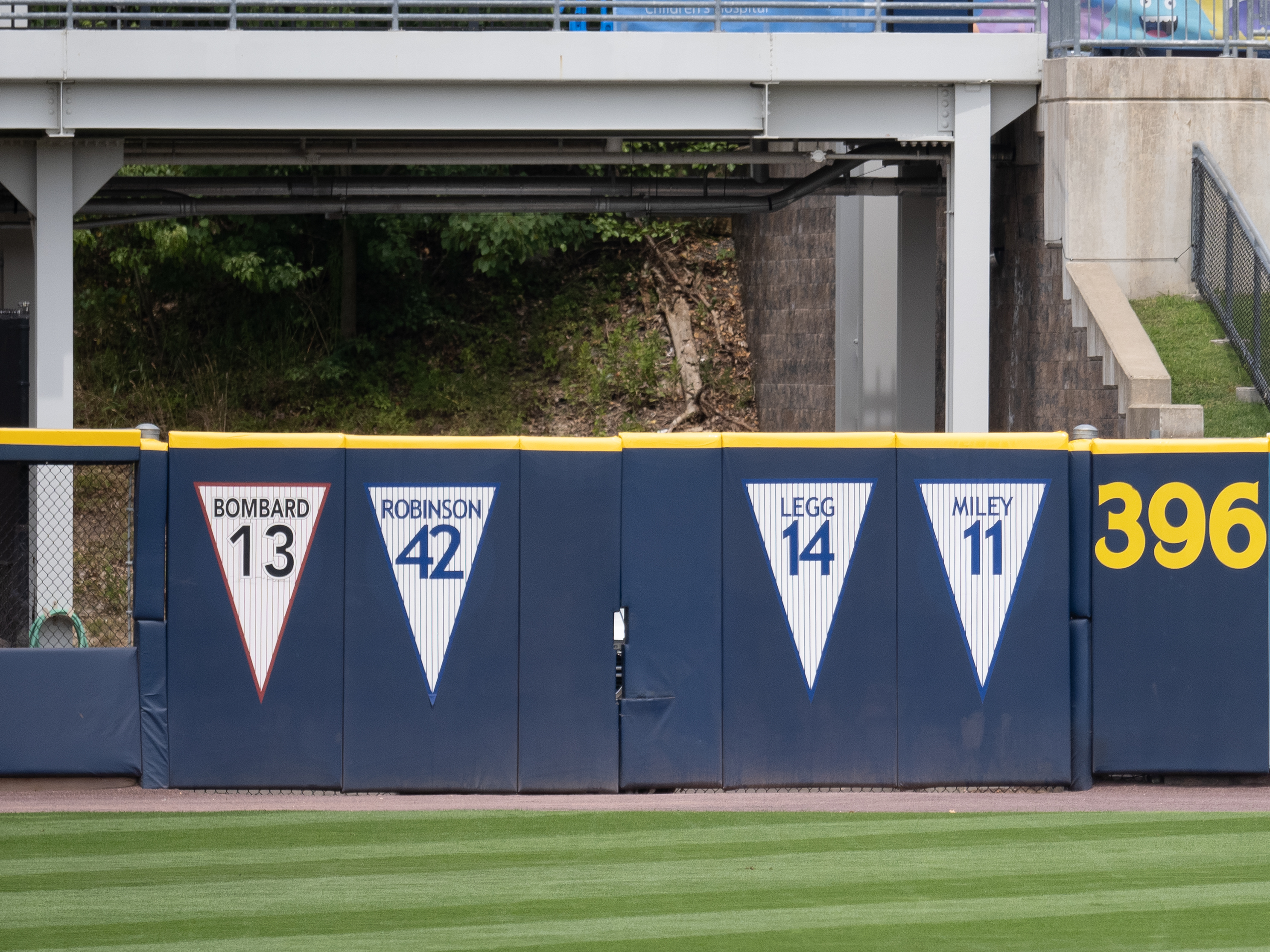
The Scranton/Wilkes-Barre Highlanders have retired four jersey numbers (above) at PNC Field.

The Highlanders have honored three players by retiring their uniform numbers. This ensures that the number will be associated with one player of particular importance to the team. An additional number, 42, was retired throughout professional baseball in 1997 to honor Jackie Robinson, the first African American to play in Major League Baseball in the modern era. Also, the team planned to retire the number 21 in honor of Roberto Clemente in conjunction with Minor League Baseball's Copa de la Diversión initiative on July 16, 2019. The team's retired numbers are displayed at PNC Field.

The number 14 was retired in honor of Greg Legg, who played for the team from 1989 to 1994. Dave Miley's number 11 was retired, to honor the team's skipper from 2007 to 2015, during the franchise's twenty-five year anniversary. Finally, Marc Bombard, who managed the Red Barons to two consecutive IL championships over eight non-consecutive terms (1997–2001, 2001–2004), had his number 13 retired on May 31, 2019.

Retired numbers
The number "11" with "MILEY" above in blue lettering set against a white background with blue pinstripes	The number "13" with "BOMBARD" above in black lettering set against a white background with dark red pinstripes	The number "14" with "LEGG" above in blue lettering set against a white background with blue pinstripes	The number "42" with "ROBINSON" above in blue lettering set against a white background with blue pinstripes
Dave Miley	Marc Bombard	Greg Legg	Jackie Robinson
Mgr; 2007–2015; Retired June 8, 2014	Mgr; 1997–2001, 2001–2004; Retired May 31, 2019	2B; 1989–1994; Retired June 8, 1998	Retired throughout professional baseball on April 15, 1997

=== Hall of Famers ===
One former Scranton/Wilkes-Barre RailRider has been elected to the National Baseball Hall of Fame. Shortstop Derek Jeter was inducted in 2020. During the 2013 season, Jeter made a rehab assignment appearance with Scranton/Wilkes-Barre while recovering from an injury with the New York Yankees. The RailRiders are also represented in the International League Hall of Fame. Managers Dave Miley and Marc Bombard were inducted in 2014 and 2015, respectively.

== Ownership ==
The Scranton/Wilkes-Barre Highlanders are owned by Diamond Baseball Holdings, a subsidiary of the investment firm Silver Lake, previously a subsidiary of Endeavor Group Holdings.

Prior to the Diamond Baseball Holdings ownership, the Highlanders were owned by SWB Yankees LLC, a joint venture between Yankee Global Enterprises and SWB Investors LLC. It was previously a joint venture between Yankee Global Enterprises and Mandalay Baseball Properties until Mandalay sold its stake in SWB Yankees LLC to SWB Investors LLC. Yankee Global Enterprises is the owner of the Highlanders' parent club the New York Yankees and SWB Investors LLC was the local ownership group that handled the day-to-day operations of the Highlanders.

The joint venture's name comes from SWB Yankees, an alternate name used by the Highlanders when they were known as the Scranton/Wilkes-Barre Yankees to distinguish themselves from their MLB affiliate, the New York Yankees. Yankee Global Enterprises and SWB Investors LLC each owned 50% in the SWB Yankees LLC joint venture, automatically gave each 50% ownership in the RailRiders. SWB Investors LLC's 50% stake in the SWB Yankees LLC joint venture was originally held by Mandalay Baseball Properties. Former MLB pitcher Andy Ashby was one of the team's owner-investors.
