= Al Pedrique =

Venezuelan baseball player and coach (born 1960)

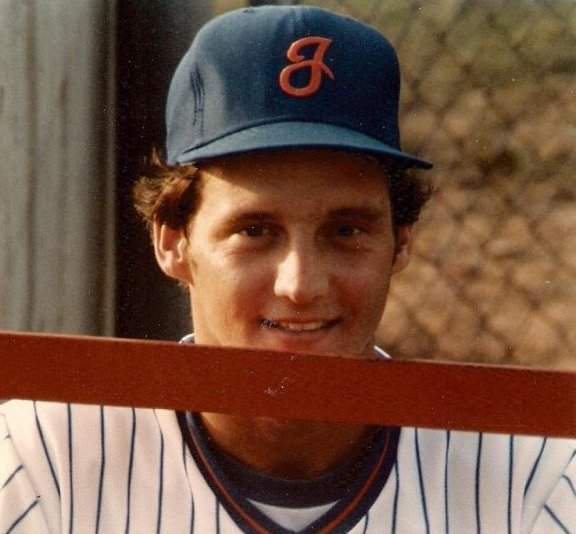
- Shortstop / Coach
- Born: August 11, 1960 (age 66); Aragua State, Venezuela
- Batted: Right Threw: Right

MLB debut
- April 14, 1987, for the New York Mets

Last MLB appearance
- June 21, 1989, for the Detroit Tigers

MLB statistics
- Batting average: .247
- Home runs: 1
- Runs batted in: 36
- Stats at Baseball Reference

Teams
- As player: New York Mets (1987); Pittsburgh Pirates (1987–1988); Detroit Tigers (1989); As manager: Arizona Diamondbacks (2004); As coach: Houston Astros (2009–2011); Oakland Athletics (2018–2020); Miami Marlins (2022)

Alfredo José Pedrique García (Spanish pronunciation: [peˈðɾike], born August 11, 1960) is a Venezuelan professional baseball player, coach, and manager. He played in Major League Baseball (MLB) as a shortstop for the New York Mets (1987), Pittsburgh Pirates (1987–88), and Detroit Tigers (1989).

Pedrique served as the Houston Astros bench coach and as manager of the Arizona Diamondbacks. He also served as the first base coach of the Oakland Athletics a season before being shuffled to third base coaching for two further seasons.

He is currently the manager for the Double-A Reading Fightin Phils.

== Playing career ==
Pedrique was signed by the New York Mets in 1978 and made his MLB debut nine years later. After five games with the 1987 Mets team he was traded to the Pittsburgh Pirates where he hit .301 in his rookie season but only managed a .188 cumulative batting average after that.

Pedrique was a career .247 hitter with one home run, 36 runs batted in (RBI), 32 runs, 18 doubles, one triple, and five stolen bases in 174 games.

== Managerial and coaching career ==
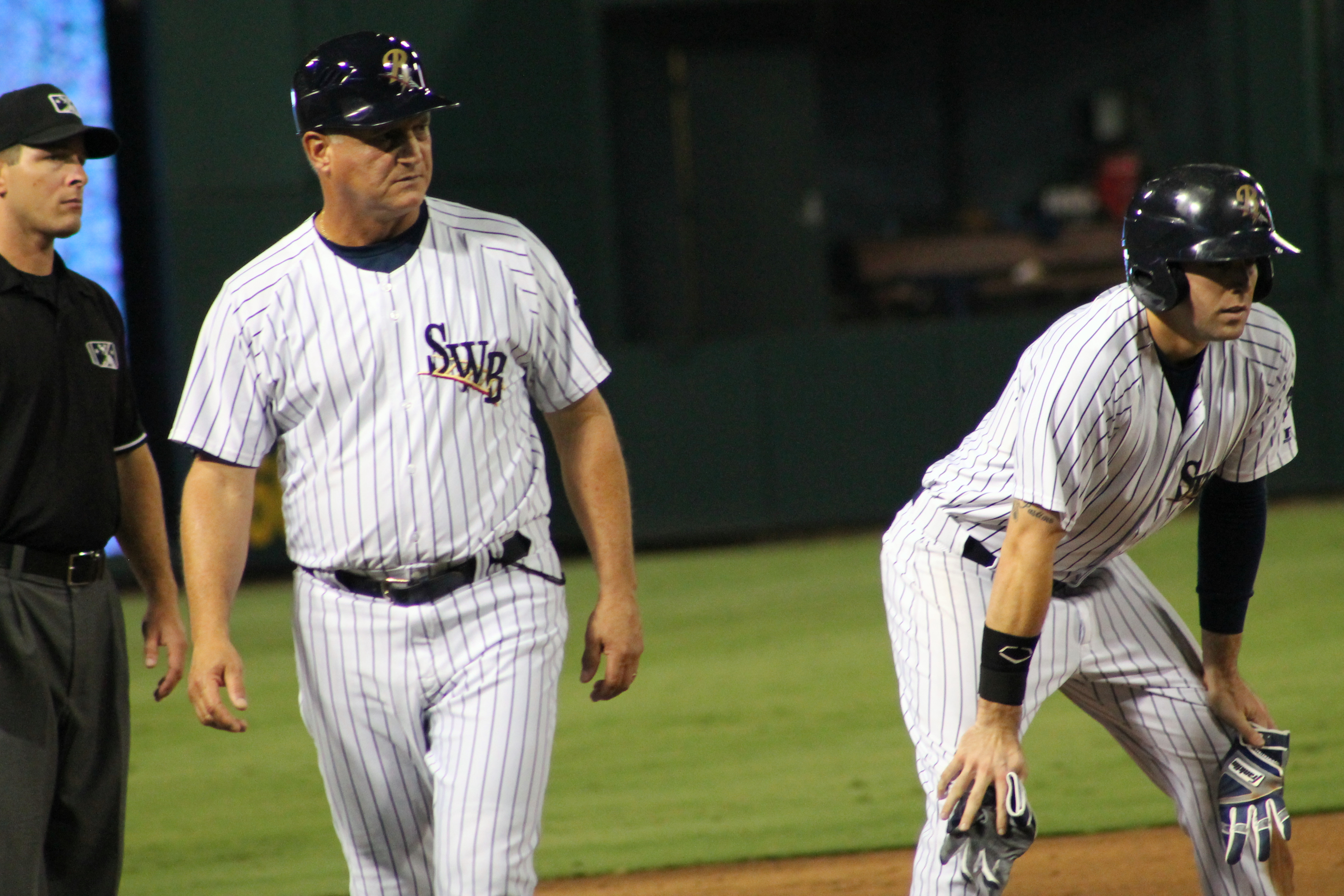
Pedrique (middle) coaches third base during a Scranton/Wilkes-Barre RailRiders game in 2016

After retiring, Pedrique managed in the minors for the Arizona Diamondbacks, Houston Astros, and Kansas City Royals organizations from 2000 to 2002. He came back to the majors in 2003 as a third base coach for the Diamondbacks. In 2004, Pedrique began the season as manager of the Tucson Sidewinders, the Diamondbacks Triple-A affiliate, but was hired as manager of the Diamondbacks on an interim basis when Bob Brenly was fired in July. Pedrique compiled a 22–61 record. He was replaced by Wally Backman, and then Bob Melvin, at the end of the season.

Pedrique created some controversy as manager when he ordered the Diamondbacks pitching staff to intentionally walk Barry Bonds throughout an entire three-game series against the San Francisco Giants from September 10–12, since Bonds was on the verge of hitting his 700th career home run, which Pedrique did not want to happen at Bank One Ballpark (in total for the series, Bonds was walked eight times (twice intentionally) while hitting one home run, and Bonds would hit his 700th on September 17th). Tom Verducci of Sports Illustrated called the incident one of "professional cowardice."

While serving as a special assistant for the Houston Astros in 2007, Pedrique was in Venezuela and championed a 16-year old Jose Altuve to the front office, convincing them that he had the talent and strength to eventually play in the major leagues. Altuve had been dismissed by scouts as being too short and thought he was lying about his age.

The Astros hired Pedrique as their bench coach on October 31, 2009, after previously serving as their Minor League Field Coordinator and third base coach. In 2013, he was hired as manager of the Yankees' Single-A affiliate Charleston RiverDogs. In 2014, the New York Yankees promoted Pedrique to the manager of the Tampa Yankees. In 2015, he was promoted to manager of the Trenton Thunder. On January 6, 2016, Pedrique was announced as the manager of the Scranton/Wilkes-Barre RailRiders. In his first season as manager, he led the RailRiders to a North Division title. Pedrique then led the RailRiders to the International League's Governors' Cup championship and won. After that, he then led the RailRiders to win Triple-A National Championship Game and won that as well. In his second and final season as RailRiders manager, Pedrique led the RailRiders to a North Division title once again. The RailRiders ended up losing to the Durham Bulls, who went on to win the Triple A National Championship at the RailRiders PNC Field, in the Governors' Cup Championship.

On December 4, 2017, Pedrique was hired by the Oakland A's as first base coach. He then shifted to third base after one season. He was let go after the 2020 season.

On March 29, 2021, he was named as the new manager for the Jacksonville Jumbo Shrimp, the Triple-A affiliate for the Miami Marlins. On November 17, 2021, the Marlins hired Pedrique as their third base and infield coach for the 2022 season.

Pedrique was named manager of the Double-A Reading Fightin Phils for the 2023 season.

== Managerial records ==
Team	Year	Regular season				Postseason			
Team	Year	Won	Lost	Win %	Finish	Won	Lost	Win %	Result
ARI	2004	22	61	.265	5th in NL West	–	–	–	–

== See also ==
- List of players from Venezuela in Major League Baseball

Sporting positions
Preceded by Mike Aldrete	Oakland Athletics first base coach 2018–2020	Succeeded by Mike Aldrete
