= History of the Nashville Sounds =

History of the Minor League Baseball franchise

The Sounds' original "Slugger" logo, used from 1978 to 1998

The Nashville Sounds Minor League Baseball team was established in Nashville, Tennessee, in 1978, after Larry Schmittou and a group of investors purchased the rights to operate an expansion franchise of the Double-A Southern League. The Sounds played their home games at Herschel Greer Stadium from its opening in 1978 until the end of the 2014 season. In 2015, the Sounds left Greer for First Tennessee Park, now known as First Horizon Park, a new facility located on the site of the historic Sulphur Dell ballpark, home to Nashville's minor league teams from 1885 to 1963.

The Sounds led all of Minor League Baseball in attendance in their inaugural season and continued to draw the Southern League's largest crowds in each of their seven years as members of the league. On the field, the team won six consecutive second-half division titles from 1979 to 1984 and won the Southern League championship twice: in 1979 as the Double-A affiliate of the Cincinnati Reds and again in 1982 as the Double-A affiliate of the New York Yankees.

In an effort to position Nashville to contend for a Major League Baseball franchise in the future, Schmittou and team owners purchased the Triple-A Evansville Triplets of the American Association and relocated the team to Nashville before the 1985 season. The Triple-A Sounds carried on the history of the Double-A team that preceded them. They rarely contended for the American Association championship, making only three appearances in the postseason during their 13 years in the league.

The Sounds became members of the Triple-A Pacific Coast League in 1998 following the dissolution of the American Association after the end of the previous season. In 23 years in the league, the team qualified for the playoffs on five occasions. They won their lone Pacific Coast League championship in 2005 as the Triple-A affiliate of the Milwaukee Brewers. In conjunction with Major League Baseball's reorganization of Minor League Baseball in 2021, Nashville was placed in the Triple-A East, which became the International League in 2022.

== Prior professional baseball in Nashville ==
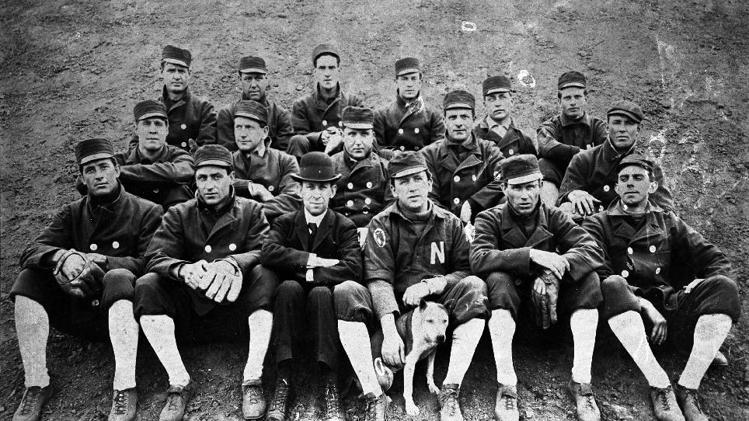
The 1901 Nashville Baseball Club of the Southern Association

Nashville has been home to Minor League Baseball teams since the late 19th century. The city's professional baseball history dates back to 1884 with the formation of the Nashville Americans, who were charter members of the original Southern League from 1885 to 1886 and played their home games at Sulphur Spring Park, later renamed Athletic Park and Sulphur Dell. This ballpark was the home of Nashville's minor league teams through 1963. In 1887, Nashville's Southern League team was called the Nashville Blues. The Nashville Tigers competed in the same league from 1893 to 1894. In 1895, the Nashville Seraphs won the city's first professional championship in the Southern League. The Nashville Centennials played in the Central League in 1897 but relocated to Henderson, Kentucky, during the season before the league's collapse.

The city's longest-operating baseball team, first known only as the Nashville Baseball Club and later renamed the Nashville Vols (short for Volunteers, the state nickname), was formed in 1901 as a charter member of the Southern Association. They remained in the league through 1961, winning eight pennants, nine playoff championships, and four Dixie Series titles. The Southern Association disbanded after the 1961 season, and no team was fielded in 1962, but the Vols played one final season in the South Atlantic League in 1963. Sulphur Dell was demolished in 1969, and the city went without a professional baseball team for 14 years until 1978.

== Getting a team and building a ballpark ==
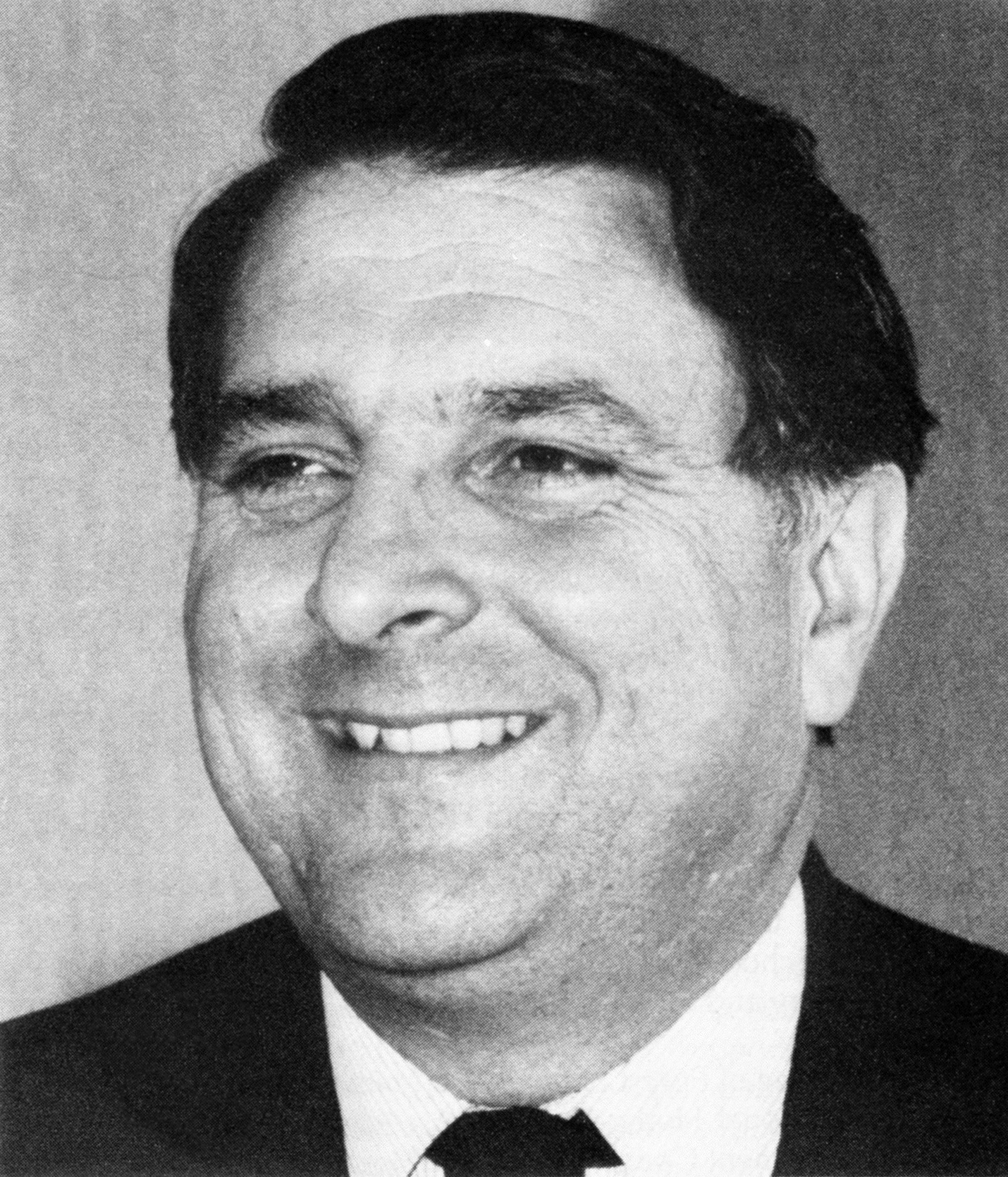
Larry Schmittou led the group that purchased a Southern League expansion franchise and financed the construction of its ballpark.

Larry Schmittou, head coach of the Vanderbilt Commodores baseball team from 1968 to 1978, was instrumental in bringing professional baseball back to Nashville. He was inspired to get involved with Minor League Baseball when he observed the large crowds the Chattanooga Lookouts drew after owner Walter Reed acquired the Birmingham Barons and relocated the team to Chattanooga in 1976. Schmittou was told by multiple Major League Baseball (MLB) teams that they would be willing to put a minor league affiliate in Nashville if he provided a suitable ballpark.

Schmittou learned from a member of the Metro Board of Parks and Recreation that neither the Parks Board or the city of Nashville would be willing to pay for such a park. So, along with help from country musician Conway Twitty, he put together a group of investors including other country artists Cal Smith and Jerry Reed, as well as other Nashvillians, to finance a stadium and a minor league team. Twenty shares valued at US$15,000 each were issued; Schmittou purchased 2 shares, or 10 percent of the team, and Twitty purchased 4 shares for a 20 percent stake. The Metro Parks Board agreed to lease to Schmittou the site of Nashville's former softball fields on the grounds of Fort Negley, a Civil War fortification, approximately two miles (3.2 km) south of downtown, for a period of 20 years as long as he built a stadium with a minimum capacity of 6,500 people at a cost of at least $400,000 within 10 years. In the second ten years, he would be required to pay the city seven percent of the team's total revenue.

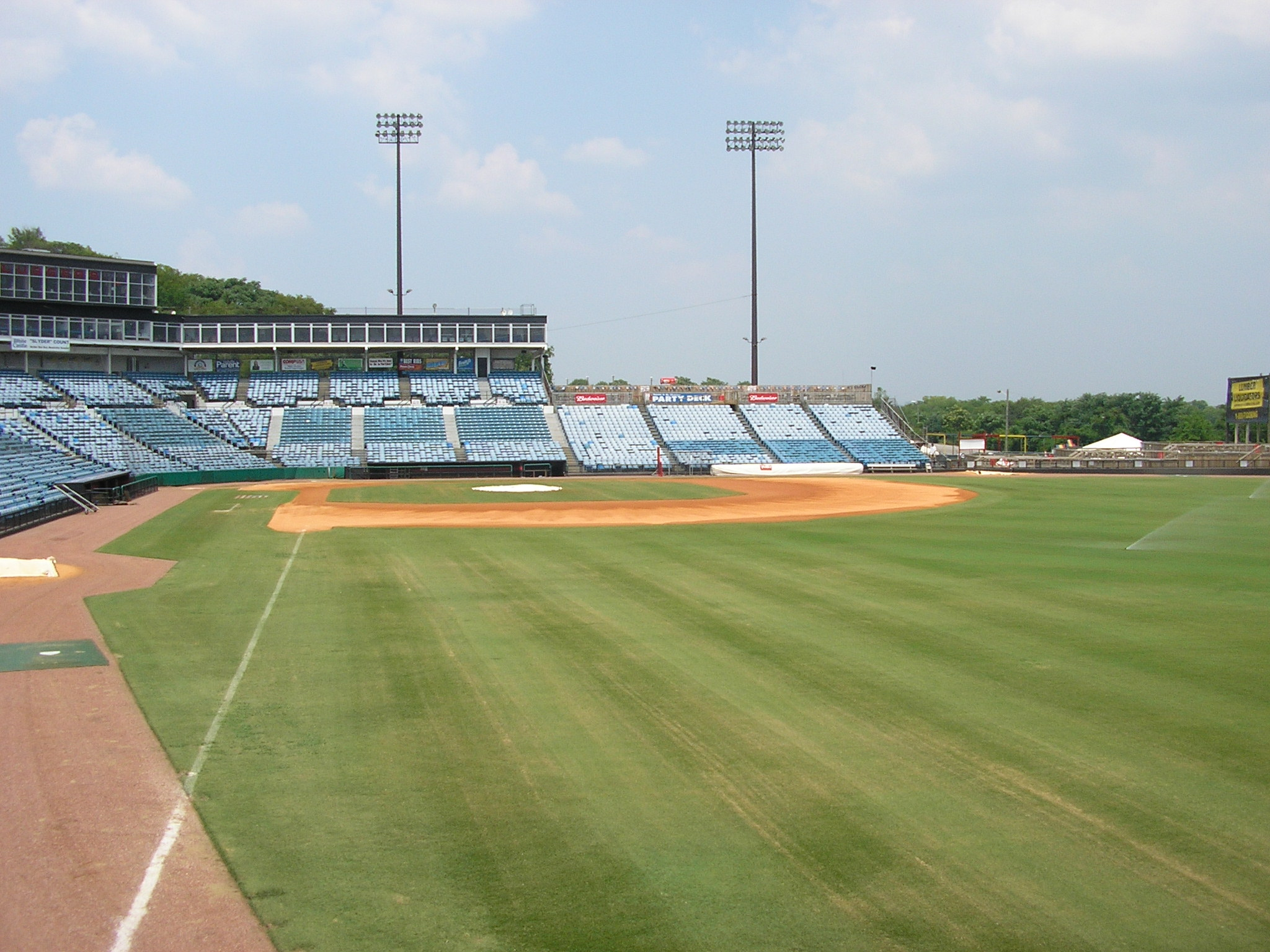
Herschel Greer Stadium, home of the Sounds for 37 years from 1978 to 2014

Stoll-Reed Architects estimated that construction of a suitable stadium would cost between $300,000 and $500,000, but bids for the project ranged from $980,000 to $1.2 million. Schmittou looked to local suppliers to donate construction materials, took out a $30,000 loan from a bank, sold season tickets in advance of having a team, and even mortgaged his own home to help pay for the facility. The actual cost totaled $1.5 million. The ballpark would be named Herschel Greer Stadium in posthumous honor of Herschel Lynn Greer, a prominent Nashville businessman and president of the Nashville Vols, whose family donated $25,000 for stadium construction.

Having secured a stadium, Schmittou and general manager Farrell Owens attended the 1976 Winter Meetings in hopes of landing a major league affiliate. After sending letters to all 26 farm team directors, the pair received a response from Sheldon "Chief" Bender of the Cincinnati Reds. Bender met with them and agreed to put a team in Nashville provided a stadium was built. Schmittou was then granted a franchise in the Southern League, a class Double-A circuit, at an enfranchisement cost of $7,500.

Fans were invited to submit suggestions for the team's name which would be voted on by a group that included local sportswriters and country musicians. Among the finalists were "Stars", "Notes", "Hits", "Strings", "Kats", "Pickers", and "Vols". The chosen name, "Sounds", was a play on the term "Nashville sound", a subgenre of American country music that traces its roots to the area in the late 1950s. The team's wordmark and color scheme were lifted from the Memphis Sounds of the American Basketball Association (ABA), who used them from 1974 to 1975. When the ABA merged with the National Basketball Association in 1976, some of the copyrights were allowed to lapse, and Nashville's baseball team adopted the abandoned scheme. The color blue was added to Memphis' red and white palette. Nashville's original logo, which was used from 1978 into 1998, and was initially sketched by Schmittou, reflected the city's association with the country music industry. It depicted a mustachioed baseball player, nicknamed "Slugger", who has hit a baseball with an acoustic guitar, a staple of country music, in place of a bat. Further illustrating the city's musical ties was the typeface, with letters that resembled G-clefs, used to display the team name and the cap logo which resembled an eighth note.

== Southern League ==
=== Cincinnati Reds (1978–1979) ===
With a team in place and a stadium under construction, the Nashville Sounds were set to begin play in 1978 as an expansion team of the Southern League. As the Double-A affiliate of the Cincinnati Reds, the Sounds played their first game on April 15, 1978, against the Memphis Chicks at Memphis' Tim McCarver Stadium, which they lost, 4–2. After falling behind in the first inning, 1–0, Nashville tied the game in the third and went ahead, 2–1, in the top of the sixth on first baseman George Weicker's single which scored center fielder Mickey Duval. In the bottom of the inning, however, Memphis answered with three unearned runs off of Sounds starting pitcher Bill Dawley and reliever Larry Rothschild, sealing the Nashville loss. The Sounds recorded their first win the next evening, defeating Memphis, 3–0. Pitchers Bruce Berenyi and Doug Corbett limited the Chicks to just three hits while catcher Mark Miller drove in a run with a third-inning double and later scored on second baseman Randy Davidson's sacrifice fly. The Sounds padded their lead in the fifth inning on outfielder Tony Moretto's RBI double.

Meanwhile, construction on Greer Stadium continued in order to be ready for the home opener. The Sounds had requested to begin the season on the road and had to swap a series with the Chattanooga Lookouts to have enough time to complete the stadium. Much of the sod that had been installed that winter died, and the replacement sod, which arrived late, had to be laid the day before the planned opening game.

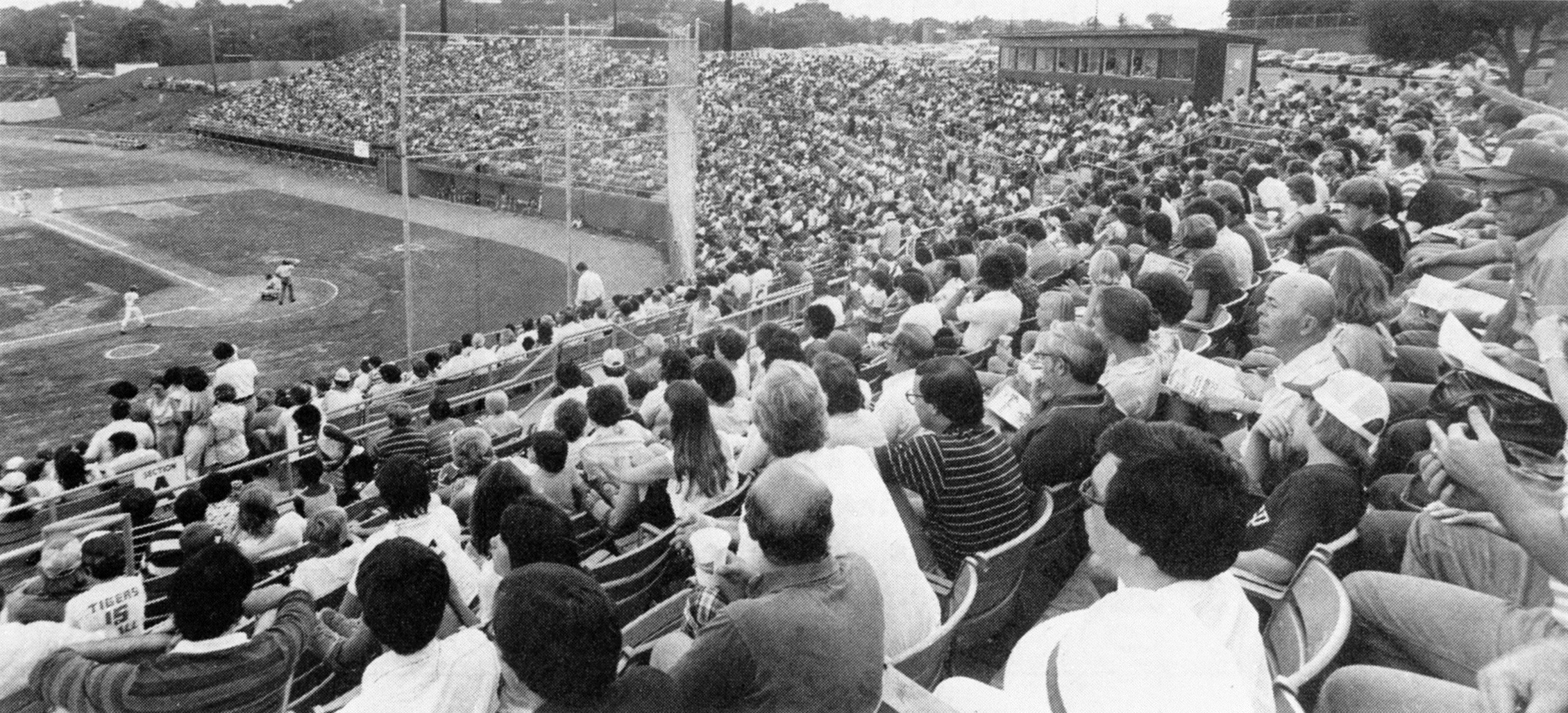
A game during the 1978 season in which Nashville led all of Minor League Baseball in attendance when 380,000 people attended games at Greer Stadium

The Greer home opener was scheduled to take place the evening of April 25, but was rained out and rescheduled for the next night. On April 26, the Sounds played their first home game, a 12–4 victory against the Savannah Braves in front of a sellout crowd of 8,156 fans. Tractors and grading machines were still preparing the field on game day, the electricity was turned on only 5 minutes before the gates opened, and the game's start was delayed 30 minutes because of traffic problems around the stadium. On the field, Sounds catcher Joe Griffin led the 16-hit Nashville offense with 4 hits of his own and 5 runs batted in while starter Bruce Berenyi got the win and closer Doug Corbett earned a save after he retired the last 11 batters in a row.

The Southern League used a split-season schedule wherein the division winners from each half qualified for the postseason championship playoffs. The Sounds, under manager Chuck Goggin, finished the first half of their inaugural season with a 28–36 record in fourth place out of five teams. This and another fourth-place finish at 36–41 in the second half kept Nashville out of the playoffs. Combining both halves of the season, the Sounds' composite record stood at 64–77 for their first season of play. All-Star pitcher Bruce Berenyi was selected for the league's Most Outstanding Pitcher Award.

The team had more success at the turnstiles than on the field. The Sounds led all of Minor League Baseball in attendance by drawing 380,000 fans to Greer Stadium in their first season. Nashville went on to lead the Southern League in attendance in each of their seven seasons of membership. Schmittou's business philosophy revolved around earning profits not from ticket sales, but from the sale of souvenirs and concessions. This approach also involved promoting family-friendly entertainment rather than baseball games. Through the mid-1980s, the Sounds offered nightly promotions and treated fans to a carnival-like atmosphere between innings. Schmittou and his team developed a promotional calendar that regularly featured giveaways ranging from T-shirts and trading cards to youth baseball equipment and even a player's used 1969 Buick Electra. Other promotions varied from discount ticket nights and buyout nights, where local businesses gave away tickets, to the more unusual "Tight Fittin' Jeans" Contest in which a woman judged to be wearing the tightest blue jeans would win a pair. The franchise was recognized for its promotion efforts when it won the Larry MacPhail Award for outstanding minor league promotions in 1978, 1980, and 1981. Schmittou was chosen for the Southern League Executive of the Year Award and Sporting News Double-A Executive of the Year Award in 1978.

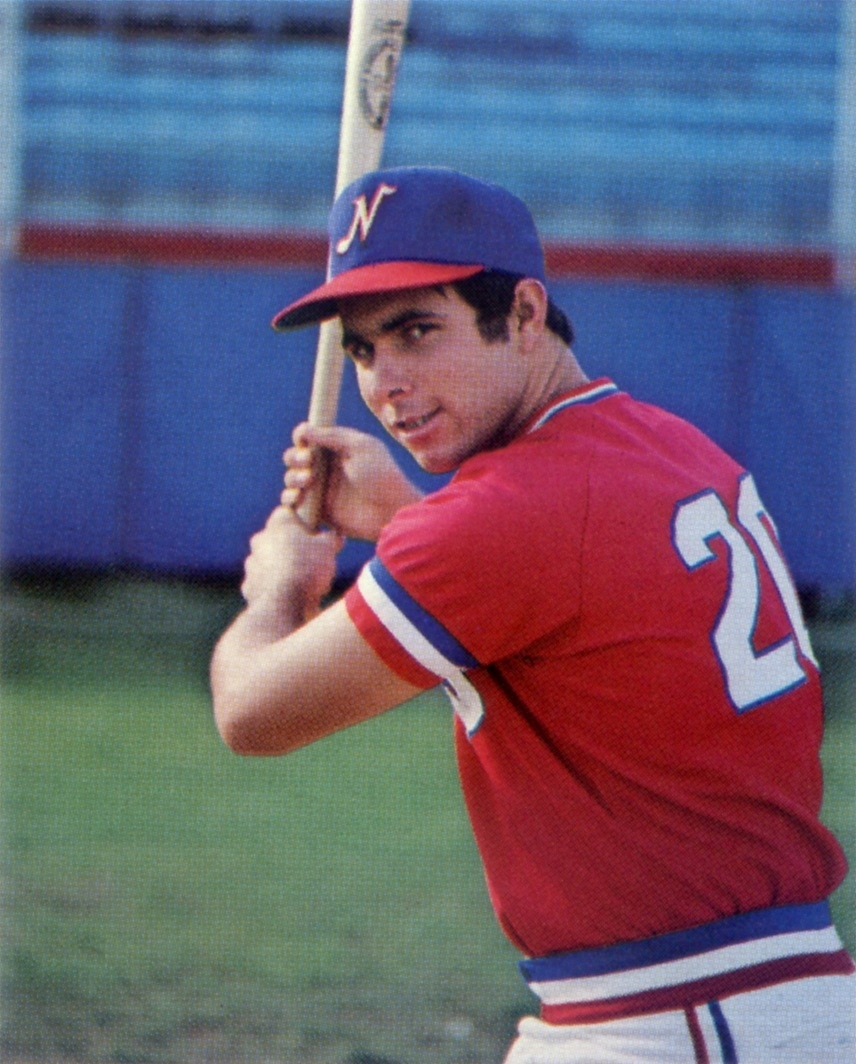
Dave Van Gorder's three-RBI triple propelled the Sounds to win the 1979 Southern League championship.

Under manager George Scherger, the Sounds started the 1979 season poorly before rallying to win 20 of 30 games in late May and June. They entered the last day of the first half in first place, but lost their game to their cross-state rivals, the Chicks, and finished in second at 35–34, a mere half game from winning the first-half title. The Sounds and Chicks met again on the last day of the second half in a split doubleheader; both games were won by Nashville to give them a 48–27 second-half record and the second-half title. The two teams then faced off in a best-of-three series to determine the Western Division champion. The Sounds won the series, two games to one, before advancing to the league championship series against the Columbus Astros. Nashville entered Game Four one win away from capturing their first Southern League championship. In the top of the ninth inning with the game tied 2–2 and the bases loaded, Sounds catcher Dave Van Gorder hit a bases-clearing triple giving his team the lead. Reliever Geoff Combe struck out the last two batters in the bottom half of the inning on the way to a 6–2 Sounds win, a three-games-to-one series victory, and the Southern League title. Schmittou wanted to give each player a $1,000 bonus for winning the pennant, but as that would have been against the National Association's rules, he settled for buying them championship rings instead. Combe, with a league-leading 27 saves, won the league's Most Outstanding Pitcher Award. The Sounds compiled an 83–61 composite record in their sophomore season.

Earlier in the year, Nashville played host to the 1979 Southern League All-Star Game. The July 12 contest pitted a team of the league's All-Stars against the major league Atlanta Braves. The All-Stars, coached by Nashville's Scherger, defeated the Braves, 5–2, before a crowd of 11,079 fans. Nashville was further represented by All-Stars Geoff Combe, Paul Householder, Dave Van Gorder, and Duane Walker. Walker, who hit an RBI single, drew a walk, stole two bases, and initiated a double play from center field by snagging a low line drive and throwing out a runner at home plate, was selected as the game's Most Valuable Player (MVP).

The Reds originally allowed Nashville to use a designated hitter (DH) in their lineup. This allowance was later revoked, as the Reds were a part of the National League in which pitchers bat instead of using a DH. Schmittou felt this put the Sounds at a disadvantage against other teams that utilized the designated hitter, so he issued an ultimatum: if Cincinnati would not let the Sounds use a DH, they would not renew their contract and would look for a new major league affiliate. The Reds did not budge on their decision to prohibit the DH, so the Sounds looked for a new parent club for 1980. Schmittou was then approached by five or six clubs looking to enter the Southern League as a Sounds affiliate. After two seasons at Double-A for the Reds, Nashville had a 152–140 win–loss record encompassing all regular-season and postseason games.

=== New York Yankees (1980–1984) ===
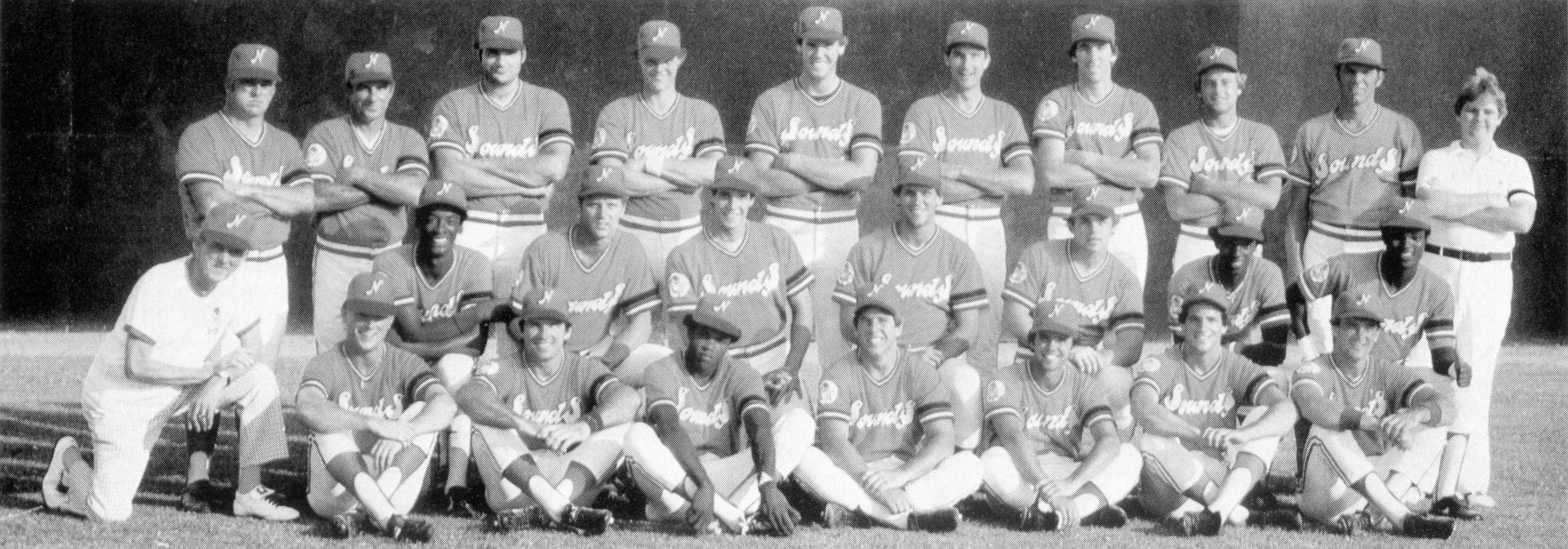
The 1980 Sounds set a franchise-best 97–46 record and swept the Southern League awards with Steve Balboni as the MVP, Andy McGaffigan as the ace pitcher, and Stump Merrill as the top manager.

Schmittou had originally been encouraged by the New York Yankees organization to establish the Sounds as a Triple-A team, but he refused to go back on his previous promise to partner with the Reds at Double-A. After the split with Cincinnati, the Sounds made their first affiliation switch in 1980, becoming the Double-A affiliate of the Yankees. Under Manager of the Year Stump Merrill, the 1980 Sounds finished the first half of the season one-and-a-half games behind the Memphis Chicks with a 46–25 record in second place. In the second half, they finished atop the division, 15 games ahead of the second-place Montgomery Rebels, at 51–21. In the Western Division championship series, Nashville lost to Memphis, three games to one. The team's pitching staff led the league in earned run average (ERA) and strikeouts, and Steve Balboni, All-Star outfielder and league MVP, led the league with 101 runs, 34 home runs, 122 RBI, and 288 total bases. Andy McGaffigan was selected as the circuit's top pitcher after he led the league with a 2.38 ERA. Their 97–46 record is the franchise-best. The 1980 Sounds were ranked as the sixty-ninth greatest minor league baseball team of all time by baseball historians in 2001. Nashville set the Southern League season attendance record that season when a total of 575,676 fans attended games at Greer Stadium.

On April 16, 1981, the Yankees made a stop in Nashville to play an exhibition game against the Sounds. The 10–1 Yankees victory was played in front of a standing-room-only crowd of 17,318 people. Those on hand for the game included Yankees owner George Steinbrenner, coach Yogi Berra, and players Reggie Jackson, Dave Winfield, Lou Piniella, Willie Randolph, and Bobby Murcer. The Sounds ended the first half of the season at 38–32 in second place behind Memphis. They won the second half with a 43–30 record and went on to win the Western Division championship by defeating the Chicks in three straight games. Ultimately, Nashville suffered defeat in the league championship series, falling to the Orlando Twins, 3–1. Nashville compiled an 81–62 record during the season under Merrill. All-Star right-hander Jamie Werly won the Southern League Most Outstanding Pitcher Award after leading the circuit with 18 complete games and 193 strikeouts.

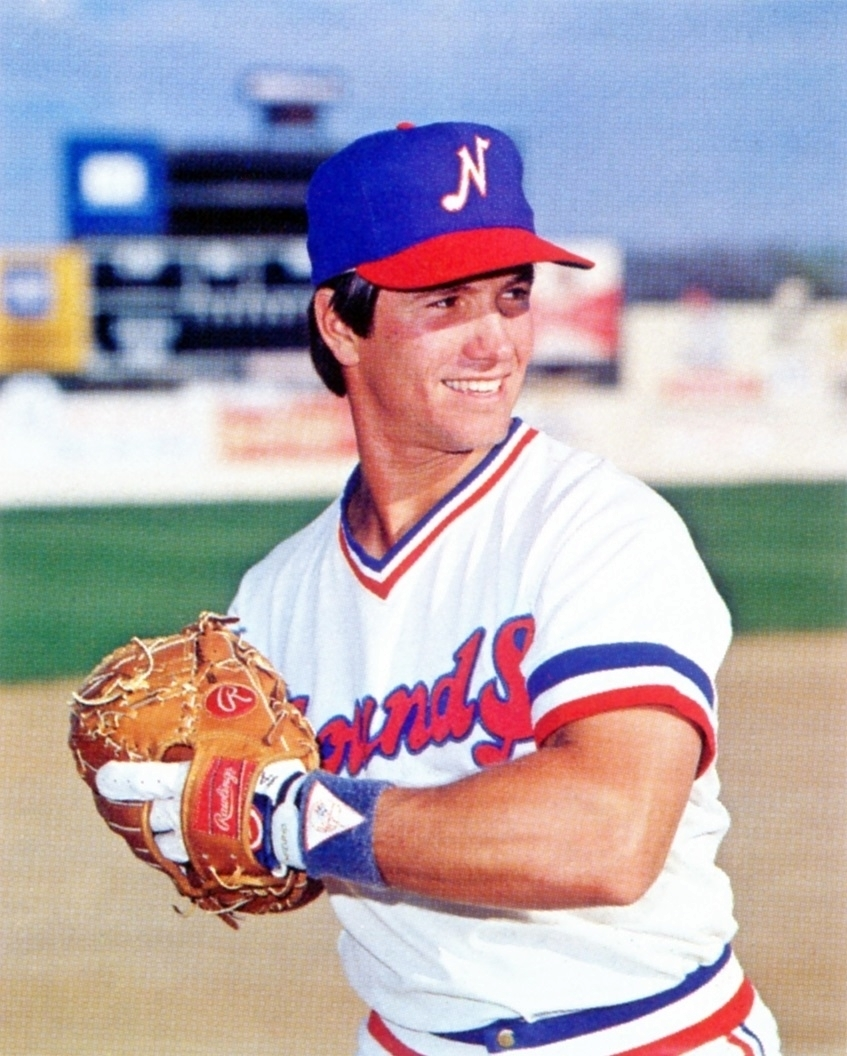
Brian Dayett hit a walk-off home run to win the 1982 Southern League title and was selected as the league MVP.

The 1982 Sounds, led by manager Johnny Oates, ended the first half in fourth place at 32–38, but won the second half, 45–29. After defeating the Knoxville Blue Jays, 3–1, in the Western Division playoffs, the Sounds advanced to the league championship series against the Jacksonville Suns. With a 2–1 series lead, Nashville entered Game Four with a chance to win their second Southern League championship in front of a home crowd at Greer. The Sounds led 3–1 after eight innings, but the Suns tied things up in the ninth sending the game to extra innings. With two outs in the bottom of the thirteenth inning, outfielder Brian Dayett hit a walk-off home run scoring Buck Showalter and giving the Sounds a 5–3 win. Nashville had won the series, 3–1, and won the franchise's second league title. Their season record was 77–67. Dayett, an All-Star, was selected as the Southern League MVP. Stefan Wever, who was also voted onto the All-Star team and paced the league with 191 strikeouts and a 2.78 ERA, was the league's Most Outstanding Pitcher. Wever was the fifth Sounds hurler in five years to win the award. Otis Nixon stole 133 bases during the 1981 and 1982 seasons, setting the franchise career record. The Sounds set the club, Greer Stadium, and Southern League single-game attendance record on August 18, 1982, when 22,315 people watched the Sounds defeat the Columbus Astros, 3–0. Portions of the outfield had to be roped off to accommodate the crowd, which was far in excess of Greer's seating capacity.

The Yankees returned for another exhibition game against the Sounds on April 28, 1983. New York had a 4–0 lead going into the bottom of the ninth inning, but a five-run rally with two outs propelled the Sounds to a 5–4 win in front of 13,641 fans. The tying and winning runs came off the bat of catcher Frank Kneuer who doubled down the left-field line, bringing home Matt Gallegos and Derwin McNealy from second and first. Among the Yankees in attendance for the game were owner George Steinbrenner, manager Billy Martin, coach Yogi Berra, and players Goose Gossage, Ken Griffey Sr., Dave Winfield, Willie Randolph, Bobby Murcer, and former Sound Don Mattingly. After the season's first half, Nashville held a 40–32 record, but that was only good enough for second place. Manager Doug Holmquist, frustrated with the team's disappointing first half, instituted a system of fines for player infractions or poor performance on the field. The program ranged from a $10 fine for a pitcher walking a batter with one on and two outs to a $100 fine for missing curfew. Rebounding, Nashville won the second-half pennant, 48–26, earning a shot at the Western Division championship. The Sounds, however, lost the decisive fifth game of the series to the Birmingham Barons, 7–5, ending their season. Nashville finished 30 games over .500, with an 88–58 record.

Also in the 1983 season, the Southern League All-Star Game returned to Nashville on June 19. As the reigning league champions, the Sounds were enlisted to serve as the All-Stars' competition. Consequently, no Sounds could be voted onto the All-Star team. In lieu of this, the league chose to recognize all Sounds players as All-Stars. The league's team bested Nashville, 3–2, before an audience of 1,221 people who waited out nearly an hour's rain delay. Nashville's Erik Peterson struck out with both the tying and winning runs on base to end the game.

The Sounds were three games shy of winning the first-half pennant in 1984, with a second-place 38–33 record. Winning the first-half title is something that eluded the team during its entire seven-year span in the Southern League. One highlight of the first half took place on May 4, when Jim Deshaies pitched the club's first no-hitter against the Columbus Astros in the second game of a seven-inning doubleheader. The Astros' lone run was scored following two walks, a batter being hit by a pitch, and a fielder's choice, which advanced a runner home. Nashville finished the second half tied for first place with the Birmingham Barons with identical 35–40 records. On September 4, the Sounds defeated the Barons in a one-game tiebreaker, 3–2 in 10 innings, to win the second-half title for the sixth consecutive season. The Sounds met the Knoxville Blue Jays in the Western Division finals, but Knoxville emerged the victor, winning three games to one. Skipper Jim Marshall led his Sounds to a 74–73 record for the season. Nashville accumulated a 431–320 record during their five-year affiliation with the Yankees, their best record among all affiliations. They had a 583–460 record over seven years in the Southern League at Double-A.

== American Association ==
In 1983, Sounds president Larry Schmittou noticed a 5 percent drop in season ticket sales, a higher ratio of no-shows from season ticket holders, and a slight decline in overall attendance. These issues with spectator turnout were accompanied by a decline in local media coverage, particularly in regard to road games. Schmittou sought to boost interest in the team through an elevation to the Triple-A classification. He attempted to purchase and relocate one of two available Triple-A franchises, the Evansville Triplets and Wichita Aeros, late in the 1983 season, but each chose to continue in their markets for 1984. His desire to land a Triple-A team was part of a larger plan to put Nashville in a position to contend for a Major League Baseball franchise in the future. Attendance continued to drop in 1984, as season ticket sales were down 12 percent and overall attendance was down almost 20 percent.

Schmittou arrived at terms in July 1984 to purchase the Triple-A Evansville Triplets of the American Association for a reported sum of $780,000, with plans to move the franchise from Evansville, Indiana, to Nashville for the 1985 season. To prove to the team's Nashville banks, which would back the purchase, that the move was financially viable, Schmittou commissioned a survey to evaluate the potential turnout for a Triple-A team versus a Double-A team. Though the research proved to team owners that the move was a sensible decision, the banks were not impressed. As a result, the team switched banks and went ahead with the purchase and relocation. The Southern League wanted Schmittou to surrender his franchise to the league, but he had plans to relocate the team to Evansville to continue as the Triplets at Double-A. However, a combination of the league's disapproval of the move and the City of Evansville being unwilling to upgrade Bosse Field resulted in a move to Huntsville, Alabama, where the team became the Huntsville Stars. The Triple-A Sounds carried on the history of the Double-A team that preceded them. The Triplets' legacy was retired, and the Stars were established as an entirely new franchise.

=== Detroit Tigers (1985–1986) ===
The Sounds entered the Triple-A playing level in 1985 as a member of the American Association affiliated with the Detroit Tigers, continuing the major league affiliation that was in place with the Evansville franchise. They played their first Triple-A game on April 11, a 3–1 win, against the Buffalo Bisons at Greer Stadium. The home team scored the winning run in the first inning. With the bases loaded following a walk, an error, and a batter being hit by a pitch, outfielder Bobby Mitchell scored on a passed ball with a head-first slide, and designated hitter Ron Johnson drove in shortstop Pedro Chavez from third on an infield out. The Triple-A opener was attended by a sparse crowd of only 4,730.

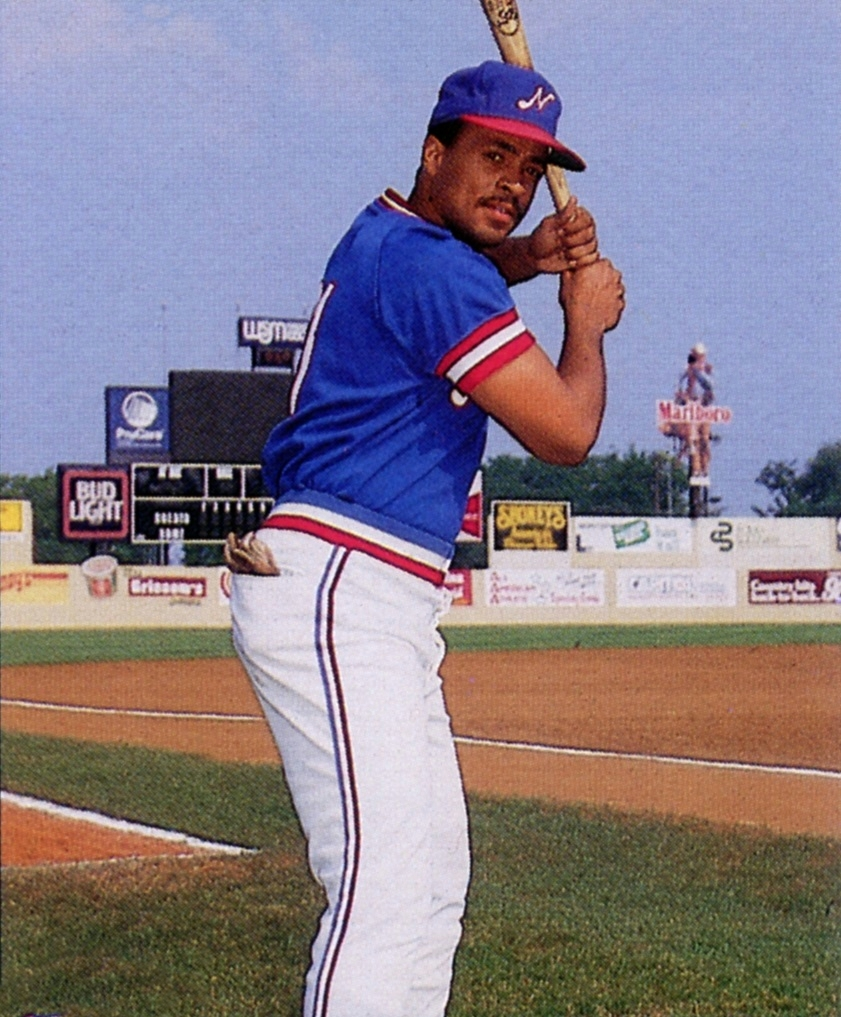
Bruce Fields drove in the winning run as the Sounds defeated the 1986 Southern League All-Star team.

The next day, April 12, Nashville competed in an exhibition game against their parent team. Manager Sparky Anderson's Detroit club included Kirk Gibson, Alan Trammell, Lou Whitaker, Rusty Kuntz, and Larry Herndon of the 1984 World Series champion Tigers. The Sounds opened the game with back-to-back base hits and went ahead 2–0 on Mike Laga's RBI double. The game was tied 3–3 after five innings, but the Tigers outlasted the Sounds, scoring six runs in the tenth to win, 9–3, before a crowd of 16,182. Seven games into the season, manager Lee Walls was hospitalized with internal bleeding in his stomach. Outfielder Leon Roberts became the acting manager for seven games until Gordon Mackenzie was brought on to lead the club for the rest of the year. On July 17, Bryan Kelly pitched the club's second no-hitter against the Oklahoma City 89ers, as the Sounds won, 6–0. Unlike the Southern League, only the club with the best overall record in each of the American Association's two divisions qualified for the playoffs. Nashville ended the season in second place in the Eastern Division, two-and-a-half games out of first, with a 71–70–1 record that excluded them from the playoffs.

The 1986 team, managed by former Sounds player Leon Roberts, was enlisted to serve as the competition in the Southern League All-Star Game, held at Huntsville's Joe W. Davis Stadium on July 23. Nashville defeated the All-Stars, 4–2. The winning run came in the fourth inning when outfielder Bruce Fields singled home catcher Matt Nokes. Starter Brian Kelly earned the win. The Sounds finished the season third in their division with a 68–74–1 regular-season record. Nashville ended its affiliation with Detroit after two seasons of poor attendance and the lackluster 1986 campaign. Over two years with the Tigers, they had a 139–144 record. Their all-time record stood at 722–604–2 after nine years of play.

=== Cincinnati Reds (1987–1992) ===
The Sounds rejoined the Cincinnati Reds farm system as their Triple-A affiliate in 1987 in a bid to increase attendance. Schmittou indicated that their market surveys had consistently shown the Reds to be the most popular MLB team in the area. Spending the beginning of the 1987 season around the top of the standings, the team hit a slump after losing a few key players midseason. The result was a 64–76 record and a last-place finish under skipper Jack Lind. One player lost due to injuries was third baseman Chris Sabo. He was promoted to Cincinnati in 1988 and was named the National League Rookie of the Year, a first for any former Sounds player.

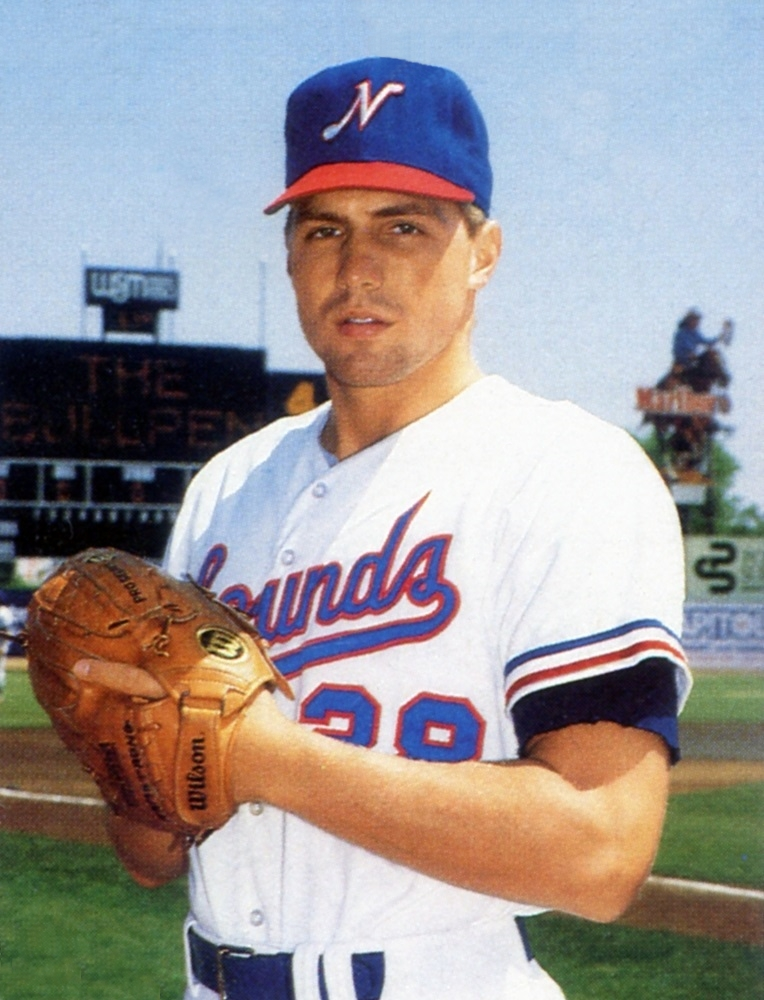
Jack Armstrong pitched a no-hitter against the Indianapolis Indians on August 7, 1988, one night after the Indians no-hit the Sounds.

The 1988 Sounds were in last place and had a 38–39 record until making numerous management changes midseason, going through five different managers in less than a month's time. Jack Lind was fired on June 27. His position was filled on an interim basis by pitching coach Wayne Garland for one game and by Jim Hoff, Cincinnati's minor league field coordinator, for five games. George Scherger, manager of the 1979 Southern League championship Sounds, was brought in next, but he chose to retire after one game. Garland managed two more games before Hoff returned for seventeen. Finally, former big league skipper Frank Lucchesi was hired on July 25 to manage the Sounds for the last 39 games of the season, leading them to a second-place finish, 16 games out of first, with a final record of 73–69.

Greer Stadium was home to a rare baseball occurrence on August 6 and 7, 1988, when Nashville and the Indianapolis Indians exchanged no-hitters on back-to-back nights. First, Indianapolis' Randy Johnson and Pat Pacillo combined for a no-hit loss against the Sounds, a 1–0 Nashville win. That game was won by Nashville when Lenny Harris walked to first base, stole second base and third base, and then came home, scoring on a groundout. The next night, Nashville's Jack Armstrong pitched the third no-hit game in franchise history, a 4–0 Sounds victory against the Indians in which he allowed only one base runner (a walk).

Lucchesi continued to manage the Sounds in 1989, leading the team to a third-place finish with a 74–72 record. Pitcher Hugh Kemp started a franchise career-record 73 games from 1987 to 1989. On April 23, 1990, 14,012 fans attended an exhibition game at Greer between Nashville and Cincinnati. Lou Piniella's Reds shut out the Sounds, 3–0. Cincinnati pitchers Danny Jackson and Ron Robinson held Nashville to just five hits, three by Terry McGriff and two by Keith Lockhart. Luis Quiñones scored the winning run in the first when he came home on a misplayed ball hit on the ground by Paul O'Neill.

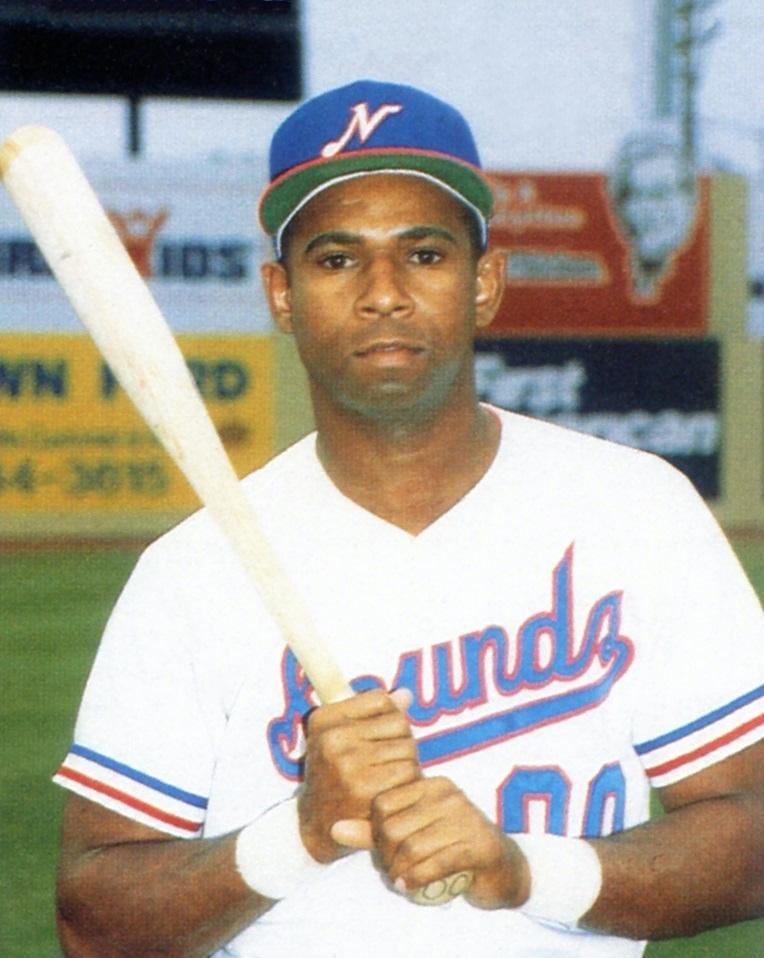
Skeeter Barnes, a Sound in 1979 and from 1988 to 1990, is the team career leader in games played (514), at bats (1,848), and hits (517).

Despite being blanked by their major league affiliate, the Sounds experienced their most successful campaign in the American Association in 1990, when they compiled an 86–61 record under manager Pete Mackanin. Ending the season in a tie for first place with the Buffalo Bisons, each with 85–61 records, the Sounds won the Eastern Division title in a one-game tiebreaker on September 4 by a score of 4–3. The extra-inning affair was ended by Chris Jones' RBI double in the top of the eighteenth inning. The Sounds advanced to their first American Association championship playoffs, but they lost the best-of-five series to the Omaha Royals, three games to two. In a decisive Game Five, Omaha got out to a 5–0 lead in the first inning, but a sixth-inning grand slam by second baseman Keith Lockhart tied the game. Both teams scored again, but the Royals came out on top, 8–7. Left-hander Chris Hammond, who led the circuit with 15 wins, 149 strikeouts, and a 2.17 ERA, won the league's Most Valuable Pitcher Award. Nashville set their all-time attendance record that year when 605,122 fans came out to Greer Stadium. Skeeter Barnes, who had previously played with Nashville in 1979, set the franchise career records for games played (514), at bats (1,848), and hits (517) during his second stint from 1988 to 1990.

Cincinnati returned for a second exhibition with Nashville on April 29, 1991. With light rain falling throughout the evening, the game was called after seven innings when the field became unplayable. Though 13 of the 16 Reds appearing in the game were 1990 World Series champions, including Barry Larkin, Chris Sabo, Paul O'Neill, and Randy Myers, the Sounds limited the visitors to just 5 hits and 2 runs while scoring a pair of runs of their own to make the score 2–2 when the game was ended. By May 1, Nashville had fallen into third place in the Eastern Division, where they remained for the rest of the season. Mackanin's Sounds posted a losing record every month during the campaign and finished the year 16 games behind first-place Buffalo with a 65–78 record.

From 1988 to 1991, American Association teams participated in interleague play with teams from the Triple-A International League in a partnership called the Triple-A Alliance. The Sounds had an interleague record of 90–78 over this four-year period. Mackanin was dismissed from his managerial duties on June 28, 1992, and replaced by Dave Miley, who was managing the Reds' Double-A Chattanooga Lookouts. The 1992 Sounds posted a 67–77 record, winding up in fourth place.

Greer Stadium, once one of the best stadiums in Triple-A baseball in terms of player and fan amenities, began to be outshined by newer ballparks being built in the late 1980s. The Reds let their player development contract with the Sounds expire so they could place their Triple-A team in Indianapolis, which was closer to Cincinnati and planning to build a new stadium. Nashville entered the offseason unsure of their next major league affiliate. Their final record after six years with the Reds at Triple-A was 431–436. Through 15 total years of competition, their all-time record stood at 1,207–1,040–2.

=== Chicago White Sox (1993–1997) ===
At the recommendation of the Office of the Commissioner of Baseball and with few options available, the Sounds signed a new player development contract with the Chicago White Sox, who wanted to move their Triple-A farm club closer to home than its previous location in Vancouver. The White Sox then presented a list of complaints about the relatively poor condition of Greer Stadium. Schmittou was unable to convince Mayor Phil Bredesen or the Metro Council to fund a new stadium to replace Greer. He considered moving the team to a surrounding county, and explored sites in La Vergne, Cool Springs, and Mount Juliet. He even tried, unsuccessfully, to get the Metro Council to pass a referendum to let taxpayers vote on a temporary tax increase to pay off a proposed $40 million stadium in three years. In the end, Schmittou elected to keep the Sounds at Greer but make significant improvements to the player dressing room and field. Another upgrade was the addition of Greer's signature guitar-shaped scoreboard, which was installed in 1993.

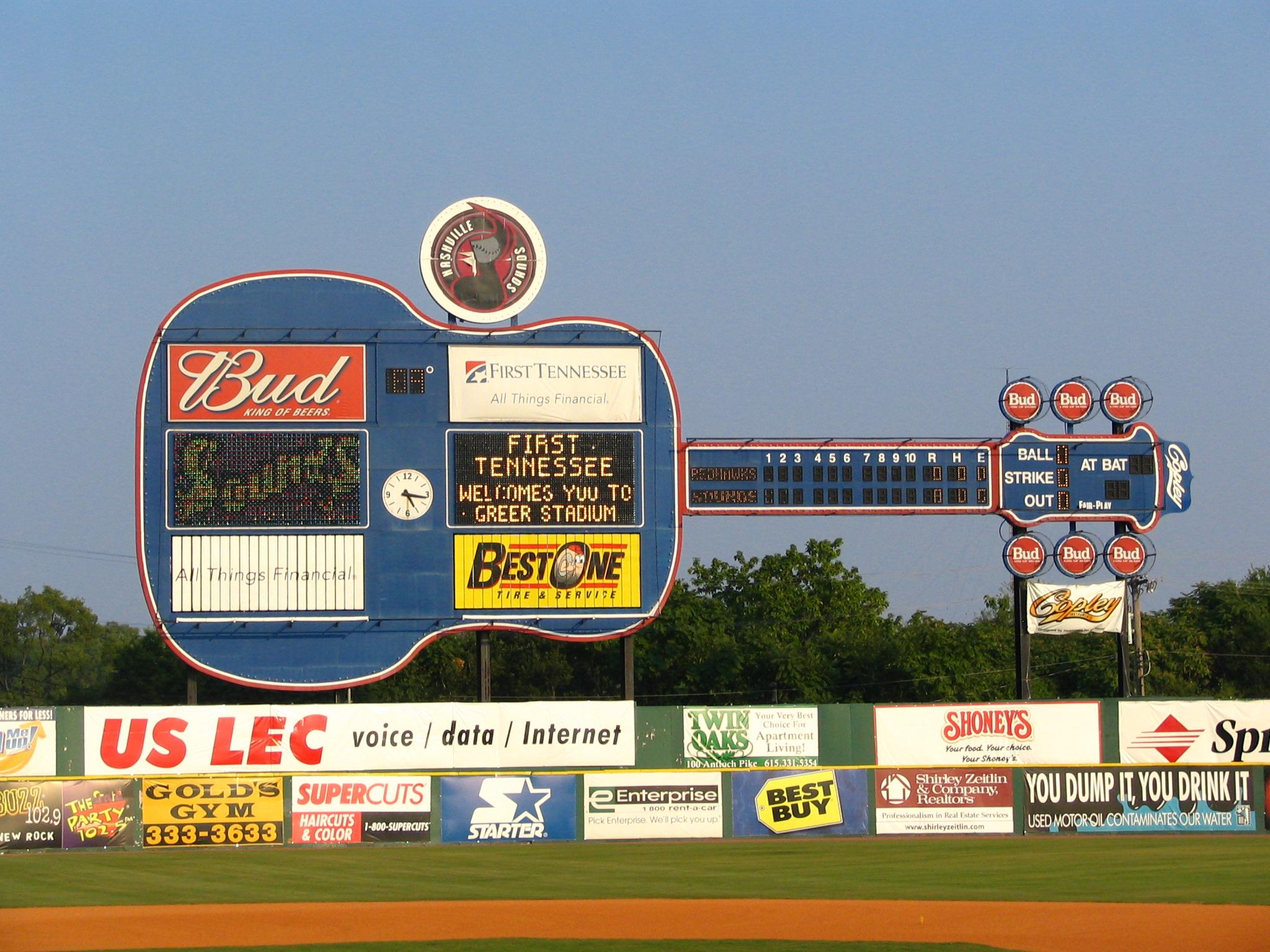
Greer Stadium's guitar scoreboard was installed prior to the 1993 season.

In their first year with the White Sox, the Sounds clinched the Eastern Division title with an 81–62 record, earning them an opportunity to play for the American Association championship. Down 3–1 in the best-of-seven series versus the Iowa Cubs, the Sounds won two elimination games to force a Game Seven. In the final game, Nashville held a 2–1 lead from the third inning to the seventh before the Cubs tied the game, necessitating extra innings. An eleventh-inning walk-off home run by Iowa's Tuffy Rhodes ended the game and Nashville's title run in a four-games-to-three series loss. Nashville's Rick Renick was named the American Association Manager of the Year.

The Sounds shared Greer Stadium with the Southern League's Nashville Xpress, previously known as the Charlotte Knights, during the 1993 and 1994 seasons. This came about when Charlotte acquired a Triple-A expansion franchise in 1993, leaving the city's Double-A team without a home. Schmittou offered Greer as a temporary home ballpark for the team. To accommodate an additional club at Greer, the Xpress' home games were scheduled for during the Sounds' road trips. In 1995, the Xpress relocated to Wilmington, North Carolina, and became the Port City Roosters.

An exhibition game against the White Sox was planned for April 3, 1994, but was cancelled due to wet grounds and the possibility of player injury. The Sounds were able to host the 1994 Triple-A All-Star Game at Greer on July 13 with 11,601 people in attendance. Nashville's Rick Renick managed the team of American League affiliated All-Stars which included Sounds Ray Durham, Drew Denson, Scott Ruffcorn, and Steve Schrenk. The team of National League affiliated All-Stars defeated the Americans, 8–5. Durham, who had three hits in three at bats and scored the game's first run, was selected as the game's MVP from the American Association. Denson participated in the previous day's Home Run Derby, but was defeated in the final round by Scott Coolbaugh of the Louisville Redbirds, six home runs to two.

The Sounds completed the 1994 season under Renick with an 83–61 record, placing them in second. The American Association had moved away from a divisional alignment to one wherein the top four teams qualified for the championship playoffs that season. In the first round, Nashville swept the New Orleans Zephyrs in three games to advance to the league finals. In the best-of-five championship series, the Indianapolis Indians defeated the Sounds, 3–1. Scott Ruffcorn, who led the American Association with 15 wins, was selected as its Most Valuable Pitcher for 1994.

Nashville compiled a 68–76 record, 20 games out of first place, in 1995. Originally, Michael Jordan, who played for the White Sox at Double-A Birmingham in 1994, was slotted to play the 1995 season for the Sounds. However, with the ongoing MLB strike, Jordan decided to quit the sport rather than become a replacement player and risk being labeled a strikebreaker. The Sounds improved their record in 1996, ending up in third place at 77–67. All-Star outfielder Jeff Abbott won the Rookie of the Year Award, and Rick Renick earned his second Manager of the Year Award.

With Greer Stadium still falling below Triple-A standards, Schmittou proposed dropping the Sounds back to Double-A in 1996 via a trade with the Southern League's Memphis Chicks. The White Sox did not see Memphis' Tim McCarver Stadium as an improvement over Greer and convinced Schmittou to delay the swap by at least a year. Schmittou instead made improvements to Greer to keep it a viable location for Triple-A baseball through 1997. The 1996 season, however, marked the last that Schmittou was the team's president and part owner. With the city prepared to welcome a National Football League franchise, the Tennessee Titans, he felt that revenue would be drawn away from the baseball team, so he and businessman Walter Nipper sold their 59 percent stake in the Sounds to Chicago-based businessmen Al Gordon, Mike Murtaugh, and Mike Woleben for an estimated $4 million.

In 1997, under the guidance of manager Tom Spencer, Nashville put together a 74–68 campaign, but a third-place finish excluded them from the playoffs. In addition to being selected for both the midseason and postseason All-Star teams, outfielder Magglio Ordóñez won the Triple-A All-Star Game MVP Award and garnered the league's Most Valuable Player and Rookie of the Year Awards. Ordóñez had led the league with 172 hits and tied for first with a .329 batting average and 249 total bases. The five-year White Sox affiliation ended after the 1997 season with the Sounds having a 390–342 record over that period. Their final American Association record stood at 960–922–2 after 13 years in the league, and their all-time 20-year record was 1,543–1,382–2.

== Pacific Coast League ==
=== Pittsburgh Pirates (1998–2004) ===
The American Association, of which the Sounds had been members since 1985, disbanded after the 1997 season. Its teams were absorbed by the two remaining Triple-A leagues—the International League and Pacific Coast League (PCL). Nashville joined the PCL, making it the easternmost team in the league. The franchise also picked up a new major league affiliation, becoming the top farm club of the Pittsburgh Pirates, who sought to escape the chilly climate and lengthy travel associated with their previous affiliate in Calgary. For the first time since the team's foundation in 1978, the Sounds began to adopt a new logo and color scheme over the course of the 1998 and 1999 seasons. The original red, white, and blue colors were replaced by red, black, white, and silver. The new team logo, replacing the original "Slugger", consisted of a black, red, and white eighth note with a baseball at the top set against a circle of the same colors, plus silver, bearing the team name in white around the sides.

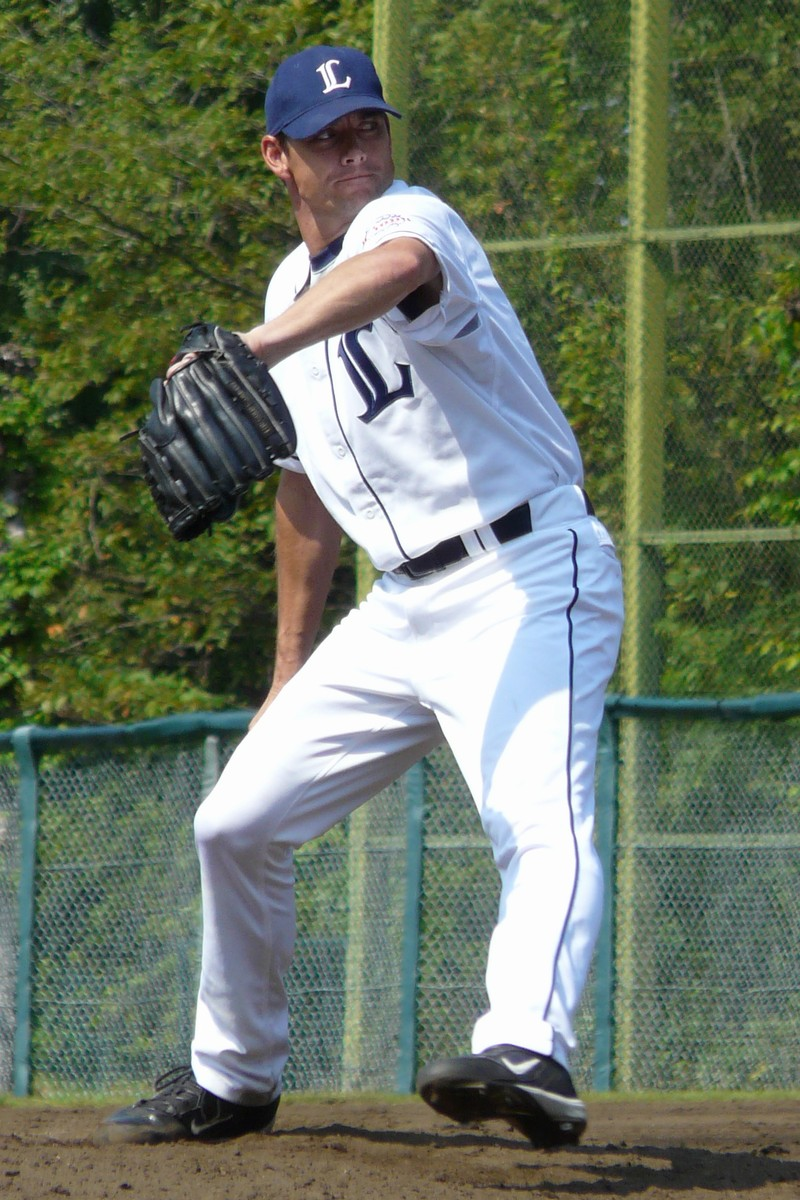
John Wasdin pitched a perfect game for the Sounds on April 7, 2003.

Nashville entered the PCL with a 7–2 loss to the Iowa Cubs at Sec Taylor Stadium in Des Moines, Iowa, on April 7, 1998. They lost the next five games before earning their first PCL victory on April 13 in a 12–3 rout against the Colorado Springs Sky Sox at Greer Stadium. The Sounds, led by manager Trent Jewett, finished their first season as a Pirates affiliate last of four teams in the American Conference Eastern Division with a 67–76 record. The team played an exhibition game against Pittsburgh on June 3, 1999, attended by 5,720 fans. The teams combined for 33 hits, including 9 home runs, in a game dominated by offense. The Pirates, whose roster included Jason Kendall, Emil Brown, and Dale Sveum, plated 13 runs in the fifth inning on the way to 16–15 win. The Sounds set the franchise record for consecutive wins when they won 15 games in a row from June 2 to 20, 1999; the record was later tied in 2018 and 2021. Overall, Jewett's 1999 team improved from the previous year, putting together an 80–60 record, but a second-place finish left them out of the PCL playoffs, where only division winners advanced to the postseason.

Richie Hebner, the Sounds' pitching coach, replaced Jewett as manager when he became the Pirates' third base coach on June 6, 2000. Nashville placed last that season with a 63–79 record. Former All-Star Sounds third baseman Marty Brown returned to the club as its manager in 2001. On June 30, Tike Redman became the first Sound to hit for the cycle. Redman collected a franchise career-record 32 triples from 2000 to 2003. The 2001 Sounds compiled a 64–77 record, leaving them in third place. Despite finishing the 2002 season with an improved 72–71 record under Brown, it was only good enough for a third-place finish, two-and-a-half games out of first. Chad Hermansen, who played for the Sounds from 1998 to 2002, holds the franchise career records for runs (303), home runs (92), and runs batted in (286).

Right-hander John Wasdin pitched the first perfect game in Sounds history in his first start of the 2003 season against the Albuquerque Isotopes on April 7. Wasdin threw 100 pitches, striking out 15 batters. The 4–0 Sounds win was the second nine-inning perfect game in the PCL's 101-year history. That year, Trent Jewett returned to lead the team to an 81–62 record. The Sounds clinched the American Eastern Division title, giving them their first playoff berth in the PCL and first postseason appearance since 1994. Nashville defeated Albuquerque in the conference series, three games to one, but then lost the best-of-five league championship series to the Sacramento River Cats in three straight games.

On May 21, 2004, catcher J. R. House became the second Sound to hit for the cycle. The team completed the 2004 season with a 63–79 record, finishing last in the division under Jewett. Jason Bay played four games in Nashville early in the year before being promoted to Pittsburgh to make his major league debut. Following the season, he became the second former Sound to win a major league Rookie of the Year Award. Closer Mark Corey saved 46 games during the 2003 and 2004 seasons, setting a franchise career record. Seeking to place their Triple-A club at a newer, more desirable stadium and to escape the high travel costs associated with playing in the PCL, Pittsburgh ended their affiliation with the Sounds after the 2004 campaign. Over seven years as a Pirates affiliate, Nashville had a 493–508 record. Through 27 years of competition, the Sounds' all-time record stood at 2,036–1,890–2.

=== Milwaukee Brewers (2005–2014) ===
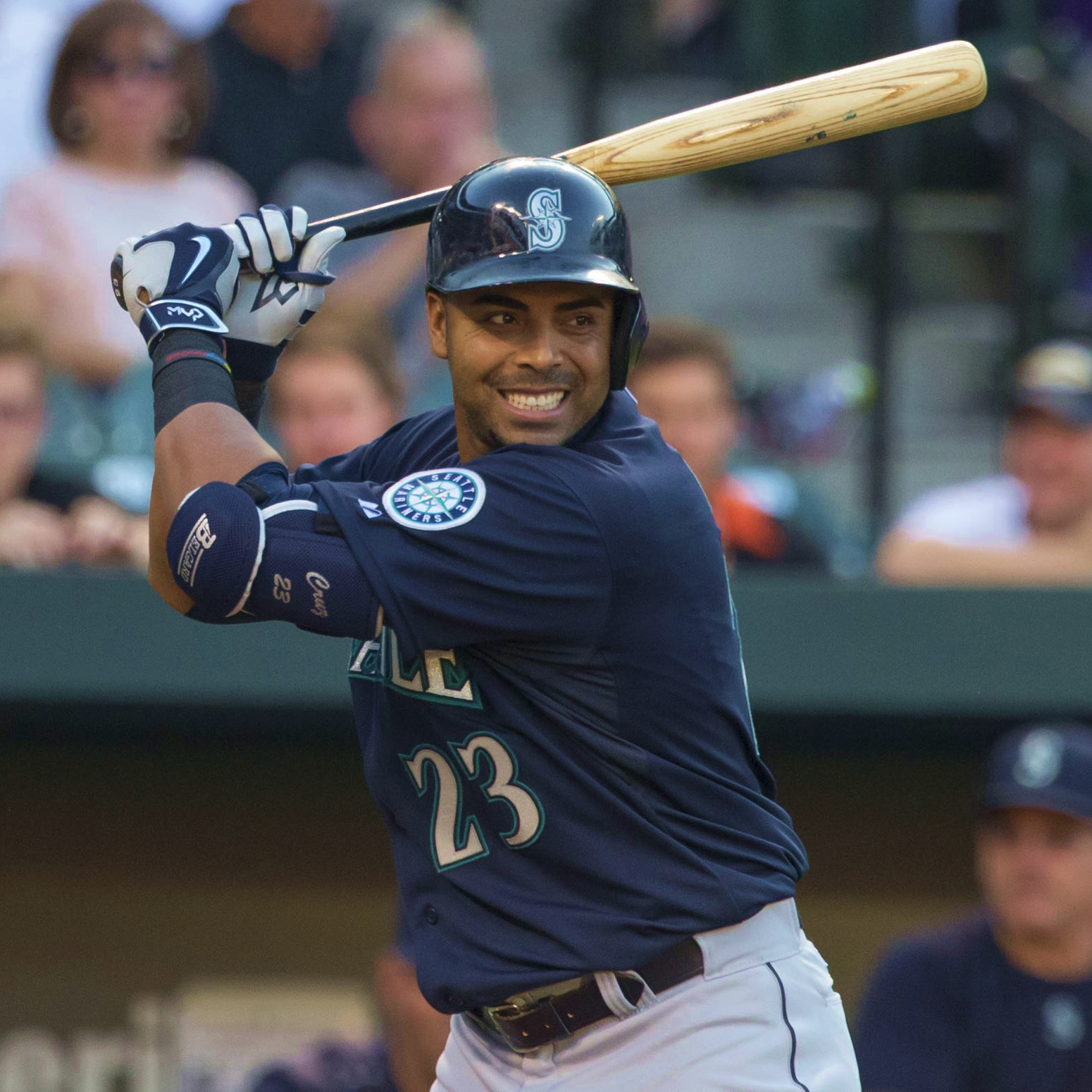
Nelson Cruz hit a three-run home run with two outs in the top of the 13th inning to help Nashville win the 2005 PCL championship.

The Sounds became the Triple-A affiliate of the Milwaukee Brewers in 2005. One factor in the Brewers' choice to partner with Nashville was the hope that the Sounds would soon get a new stadium to replace the then-27-year-old Greer. Along with a new affiliate, Nashville debuted a new oval-shaped logo with a baseball player silhouetted against a yellow background hitting a ball toward the Nashville skyline, with the city's name written above in white within a red border and the team nickname written in red and black script below.

The 2005 club, managed by Frank Kremblas, led the American Conference Northern Division for most of the year but only clinched on the penultimate day of the season, having lost 16 of 19 games in late August and September. Their final season record stood at 75–69. Nashville defeated the Oklahoma RedHawks with a 7–3 win in Game Five of the conference series to advance to the league championship series. They went on to sweep the Tacoma Rainiers in three straight games to win the 2005 Pacific Coast League championship. Outfielder Nelson Cruz hit a three-run home run with two outs in the top of the 13th inning, and reliever Brett Evert closed out the game to give the Sounds their first championship at the Triple-A level since moving to the classification in 1985 and their first since the 1982 Southern League crown.

On May 5–6, 2006, the Sounds participated in a 24-inning game against the New Orleans Zephyrs. Lasting a total of eight hours and seven minutes, the first 18 innings were played the first night and the other 6 the next evening. The game matched the longest game, in terms of innings played, in PCL history. Several team and league records were broken by both clubs. On July 15, Carlos Villanueva, Mike Meyers, and Alec Zumwalt combined to pitch the fifth no-hitter in team history, a 2–0 win over the Memphis Redbirds. The Sounds finished the season with a 76–68 record under Kremblas, tied with the Iowa Cubs for first place. Nashville won the division title and advanced to the postseason by means of a tiebreaker (winning the regular-season series versus Iowa, nine games to seven). In the conference championship series, Nashville lost to the Round Rock Express, three games to two, after being shutout in Game Five, 8–0.

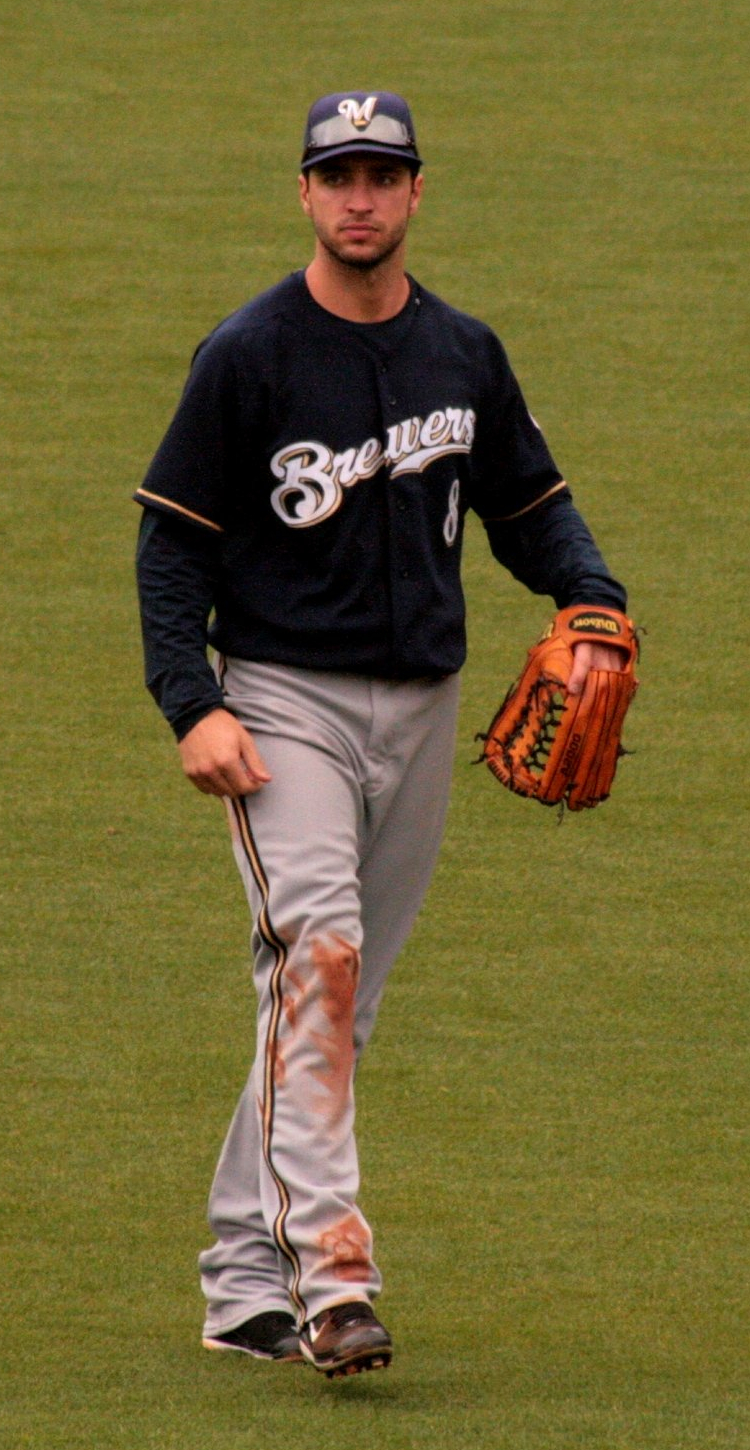
Ryan Braun, who played third base in 2007, won the National League Rookie of the Year Award that same season with the Brewers.

The 2007 team included Brewers third base prospect Ryan Braun, who made his major league debut on May 25 and was named National League Rookie of the Year following the season, becoming the third former Sound to win this award. On June 25, Manny Parra pitched the club's second perfect game, the third nine-inning perfect game in PCL history, against Round Rock. Parra threw 107 pitches, striking out 11 batters. Led by PCL Manager of the Year Frank Kremblas, the team won the American Northern Division title for the third straight year and posted a league-best 89–55 record. Ultimately, they were defeated by New Orleans, three games to one, in the conference series. Nashville-native knuckleball pitcher and 13-game winner R. A. Dickey won the PCL Pitcher of the Year Award.

Massive flooding in the Midwest resulted in the Sounds and Iowa Cubs playing a game with an official attendance of zero on June 14, 2008. Though downtown Des Moines was under a mandatory evacuation, team officials received permission from the city to play the game as long as no fans were allowed into Principal Park. To keep fans away, the lights and scoreboard were not turned on, the game was not broadcast in the local market, and a message on the team's website announced that the game was postponed. PCL commissioner Branch Rickey III believed that this was the first time such actions were taken out of necessity. Kremblas' Sounds placed fourth with a 59–81 record.

The Sounds had planned to leave Greer Stadium in the mid-2000s for a new ballpark to be called First Tennessee Field, but the project was abandoned after the city, developers, and team could not come to terms on a plan to finance its construction. On October 30, 2008, following this failure to secure a new ballpark, Al Gordon's Amerisports Companies agreed to sell the Sounds to MFP Baseball, a New York-based group of investors consisting of Masahiro Honzawa, Steve Posner, and Frank Ward for an estimated $20 million. Keeping the team in Nashville was one of the PCL's top criteria for approval of the sale. The transaction received final approval from Major League Baseball and the PCL on February 26, 2009. MFP made significant renovations to Greer while it continued to explore options for building a new downtown ballpark.

Don Money managed the 2009 Sounds to achieve a 75–69 record, an improvement over the previous season, but still two games behind their cross-state rival Memphis. They improved further in 2010 under Money but placed last at 77–67. Caleb Gindl became the third Sound to hit for the cycle when he accomplished the feat on July 10, 2011. With Money at the helm, his team placed third with a 71–73 record. Led by Mike Guerrero, the 2012 Sounds placed second at 67–77, a distant 16 games out of first. Nashville set a franchise-low win–loss record in 2013 with a 57–87 season. Despite the team's performance, Johnny Hellweg won the PCL Pitcher of the Year Award with a league-best .706 (12–5) winning percentage, and Guerrero was selected for the Mike Coolbaugh Award in recognition for his contributions to the game of baseball.

Before the 2014 season, the Sounds, Metro Nashville, and the State of Tennessee finalized a plan to build a new ballpark to replace Greer Stadium at the beginning of the 2015 season. On August 27, 2014, the Sounds hosted the final game at Greer, an 8–5 loss to the Sacramento River Cats. In his only plate appearance, Nashville catcher Lucas May struck out swinging with a full count and the bases loaded to end the game. The attendance was a standing-room-only crowd of 11,067, the first sellout since 2010, and the largest crowd since 2007. The team, led by veteran minor league manager Rick Sweet, finished the season with a 76–67 record, in second place, two-and-a-half games behind Memphis. Jimmy Nelson, the Brewers' top prospect at the start of the season, was elected PCL Pitcher of the Year; he received all but one of the votes after posting a league-leading 1.46 ERA. The Sounds severed ties with the Brewers, with whom they had had the longest affiliation in franchise history, after the 2014 season citing poor on-field performance from recent Brewers Triple-A teams. They had a 732–721 record in their ten years as a Brewers affiliate. Overall, the Sounds' 37-year record stood at 2,768–2,611–2.

=== Oakland Athletics (2015–2018) ===
Nashville affiliated with the Oakland Athletics in 2015 due in part to the organization's commitment to fielding competitive teams at the Triple-A level, an area in which co-owner Frank Ward felt Milwaukee lacked. The Sounds also introduced a new set of logos that incorporated elements that reflected Nashville's "Music City" nickname, such as guitars, picks, and sound holes, as well as neon signs such as those in the city's Broadway entertainment district. The team hired sports design firm Brandiose to create their new visual identity. At one point, the firm was asked to explore new team nicknames which included "Platinums", "Picks", "DrumSticks", and "Roosters". Nashville chose to stick with the Sounds moniker, but initially elected to embrace a new color scheme that included Broadway Burnt Orange, Sunburst Tan, Neon Orange, and Cash Black. However, the team returned to the previous red and black palette, with the addition of platinum silver as an accent color, before the season began after receiving mixed feedback from team fans. The new primary logo was a red "N" set against a silver guitar pick, both with black borders.

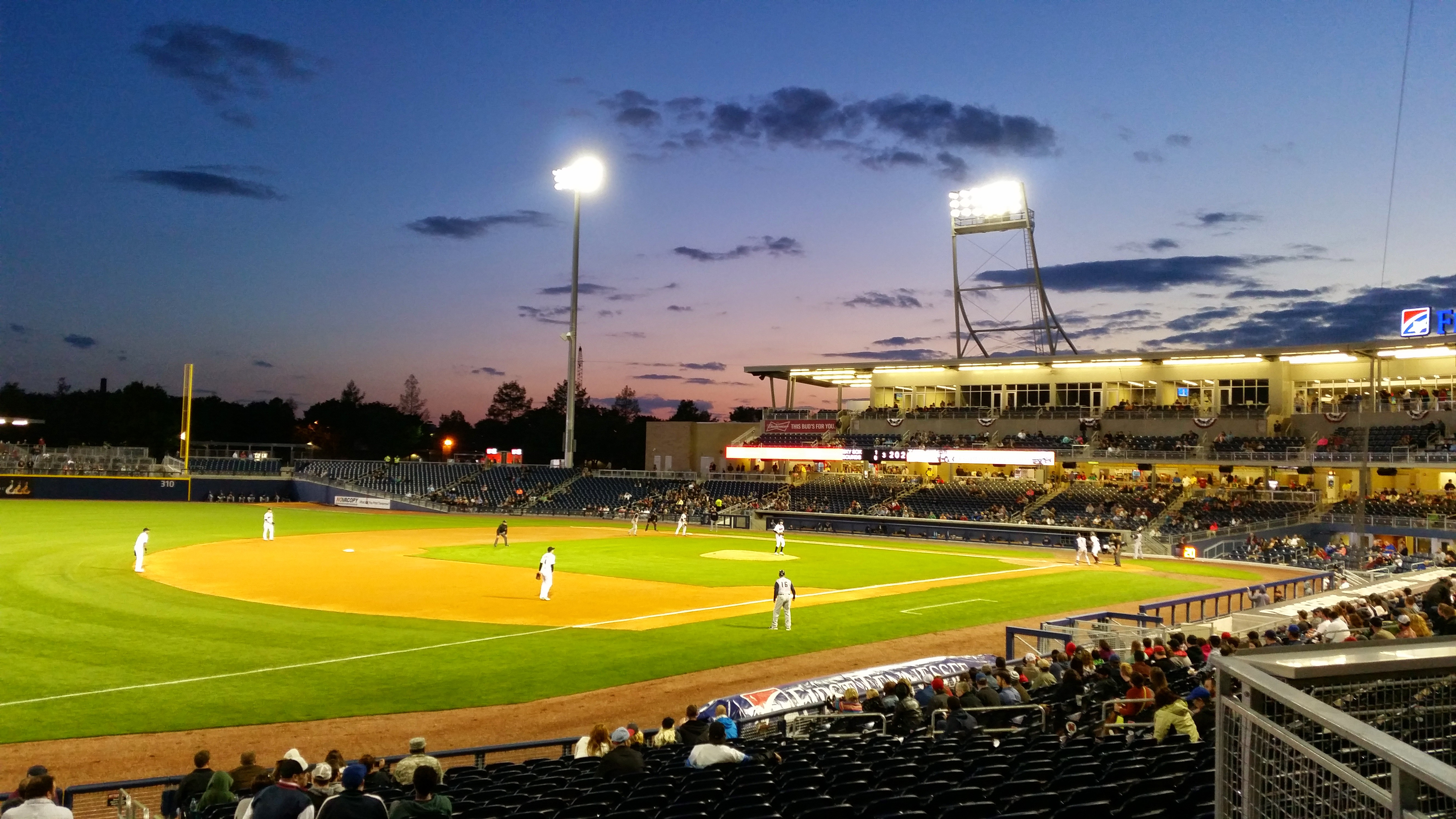
First Horizon Park, then known as First Tennessee Park, opened in 2015 at the site of the historic Sulphur Dell ballpark.

The start of the 2015 season marked the first time that the Sounds played at the new $91 million First Horizon Park, then known as First Tennessee Park, which is located at the site of the historic Sulphur Dell ballpark just north of the Tennessee State Capitol and east of Bicentennial Capitol Mall State Park in downtown Nashville. The Sounds defeated the Colorado Springs Sky Sox, 3–2 in 10 innings, in the inaugural home opener on April 17 in front of 10,459 people. Max Muncy secured the win with a walk-off RBI double, scoring Billy Burns from first base, before being mobbed by his Sounds teammates on the field. Under manager Steve Scarsone, Nashville ended their first season as an A's affiliate in third place with a 66–78 record.

In 2016, Scarsone led the Sounds to a league-best 83–59 record and the American Conference Southern Division title, sending the team to the postseason for the first time since 2007. In a dramatic back-and-forth game five of the conference series at First Tennessee Park, the Sounds were eliminated by the Oklahoma City Dodgers, three games to two. Scarsone was honored with the PCL Manager of the Year Award.

Pitchers Chris Smith, Sean Doolittle, Tucker Healy, and Simón Castro combined to pitch the Sounds' seventh no-hitter on June 7, 2017, against the Omaha Storm Chasers, a 4–0 road win. At the 2017 Triple-A All-Star Game, left fielder and eventual All-Star MVP Award winner Renato Núñez hit a three-run home run to propel the PCL past the IL for a 4–3 victory. Joey Wendle hit a franchise career-record 102 doubles from 2015 to 2017. Nashville finished the 2017 season in second place with a 68–71 record under manager Ryan Christenson. The 2018 team, led by Fran Riordan, tied the 1999 franchise-high 15-game winning streak from July 29 to August 14; this was later tied again in 2021. The Sounds posted another second-place finish in 2018 with a 72–68 record.

Nashville declined to renew their contract with Oakland for 2019, choosing instead to seek a new major league affiliate. Through four seasons of competition as the top farm club of the Athletics, the Sounds had a 291–279 record. Through 41 total seasons of play, their all-time record stood at 3,059–2,890–2.

=== Texas Rangers (2019–2020) ===
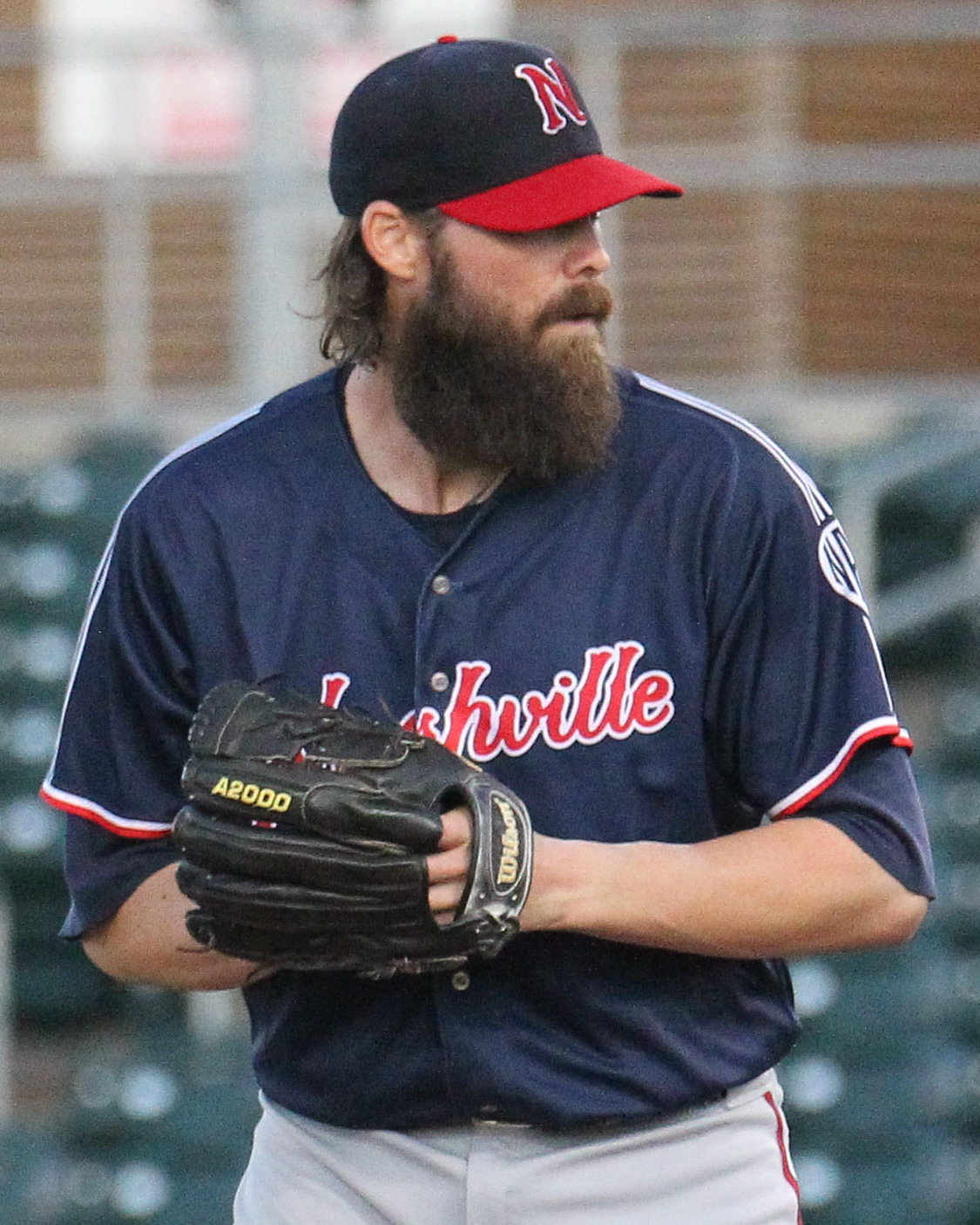
Tim Dillard set the career record for wins (48), games pitched (242), innings pitched (710), and strikeouts (437) from 2007 to 2014 and in 2019.

Nashville became the Triple-A affiliate of the Texas Rangers in 2019. The Sounds sought out the Rangers after identifying them as one of the most popular MLB teams among local baseball fans—behind the Atlanta Braves and St. Louis Cardinals—and for their geographical proximity. Also in 2019, just four years after their previous rebranding, the team debuted new colors and logos which pull together elements from their original visual identity and the musical imagery present throughout their franchise history. The new colors, navy blue, red, and white, are modernized versions of their first colors. The primary logo is a pair of concentric red rings with the team name in navy between the two divided horizontally at its center by twin red and blue stripes; a navy "N" resembling the F-hole of a guitar or violin is in the inner ring, which is styled like a baseball. The Sounds also began participation in Copa de la Diversión ("Fun Cup"), an initiative by Minor League Baseball to connect teams with their local Hispanic communities. For Copa games, the Sounds play as the Vihuelas de Nashville. The vihuela, a high-pitched Mexican guitar popular with mariachi groups, reflected the city's musical ties.

The Sounds hosted the Rangers at First Tennessee Park for an exhibition game on March 24, 2019. Managed by former Sound Chris Woodward, the Texas squad included players Delino DeShields Jr., Nomar Mazara, Hunter Pence, Ronald Guzmán, Isiah Kiner-Falefa, and José Leclerc. Nashville's Preston Beck scored the decisive run in the bottom of the sixth inning with a two-run homer to give the Sounds a 4–3 victory with 11,824 people in attendance. Nashville ended the season in third place with a 66–72 record under manager and former Sound Jason Wood. Veteran sidearm pitcher Tim Dillard, previously with the Sounds from 2007 to 2014, returned to the club in 2019. In his second stretch, he set the franchise career records for games pitched (242) and strikeouts (437) while adding to his existing marks for wins (48) and innings pitched (710).

The start of the 2020 season was postponed due to the COVID-19 pandemic before being cancelled on June 30. In light of the cancellation, the Sounds planned to host a series of games between two teams of professional free agents that would have coincided with the condensed 2020 MLB season and served as an emergency player pool for major league clubs. This, too, was cancelled following a spike in local COVID-19 cases and the city reverting to an earlier phase of its reopening plan.

Following the 2020 season, Major League Baseball assumed control of Minor League Baseball in a move to increase player salaries, modernize facility standards, and reduce travel. Affiliations were rearranged to situate Triple-A teams closer to their major league parent clubs. The Texas Rangers chose to move their Triple-A affiliation back to Round Rock, Texas, where it had been prior to partnering with Nashville. As a Rangers farm club, the Sounds had a 66–72 record, their lowest record among all affiliations. Nashville held a 1,582–1,580 record over 23 years in the Pacific Coast League, while their all-time record stood at 3,125–2,962–2 after 42 seasons played over the course of 43 years.

== International League ==
=== Milwaukee Brewers (2021–present) ===
The Sounds became the Triple-A affiliate of the Milwaukee Brewers for a second time in 2021 upon signing a 10-year Professional Development License that runs through 2030. The Brewers desired reuniting with Nashville because of the quality of the player facilities at First Horizon Park and convenient travel options to and from the city. Along with Major League Baseball's restructuring of the minors, the Pacific Coast League disbanded, and the Sounds were placed in the Triple-A East.

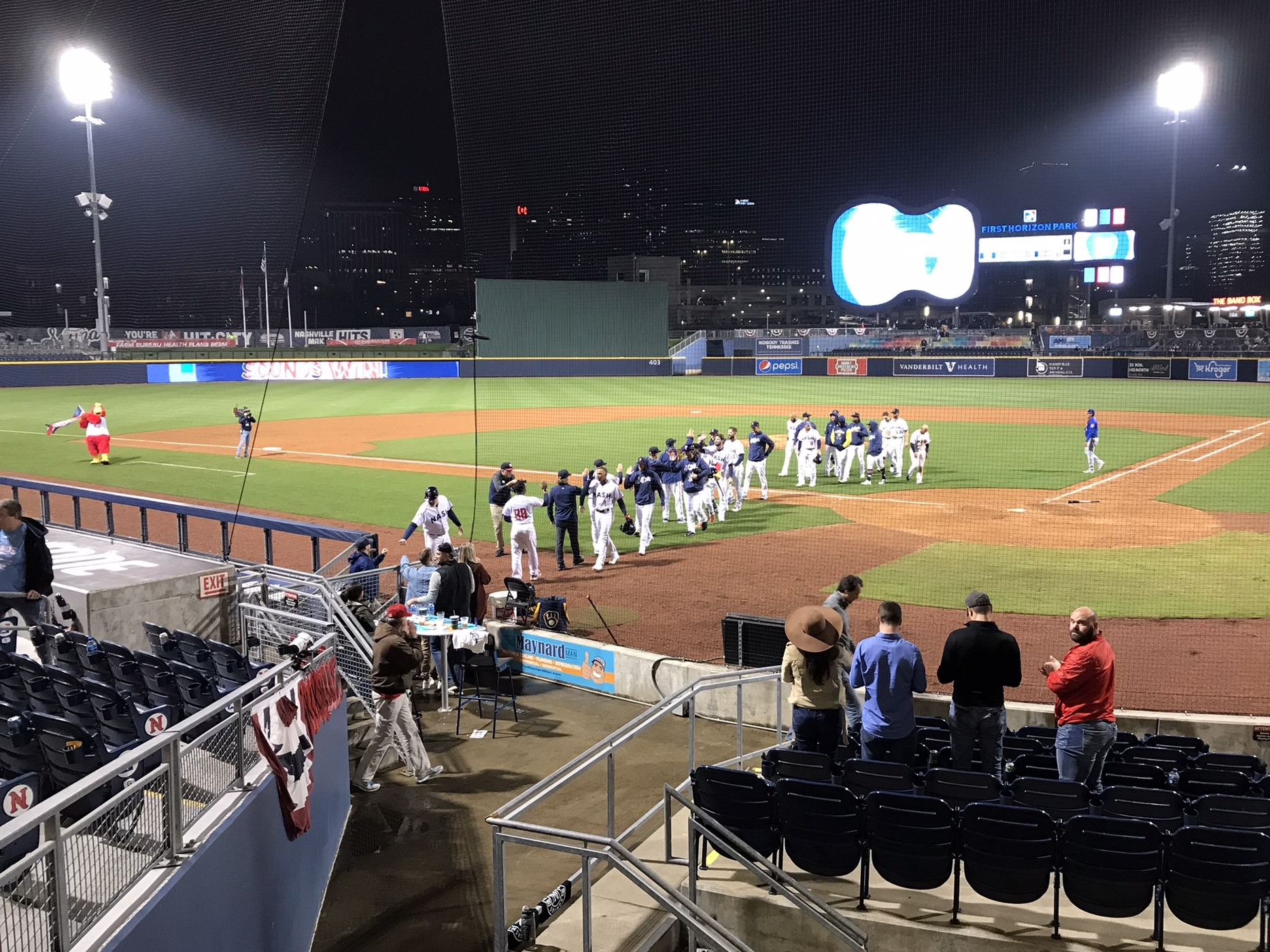
The Sounds celebrating their first win in the International League on April 5, 2022, at First Horizon Park

Opening Day for the 2021 season was postponed for nearly a month to temporarily eliminate commercial air travel and give players the opportunity to be vaccinated against COVID-19 before the season started. Nashville eventually began competition in the new league on May 4 with an 8–6 loss to the Toledo Mud Hens at Fifth Third Field in Toledo, Ohio. Following another loss and a rainout, they won both games of a seven-inning doubleheader on May 7 against Toledo, 5–0 and 5–4, for their first league wins. The Sounds won 15 consecutive games from May 18 to June 3, matching the franchise record set in 1999 and tied in 2018. Under Rick Sweet, who previously managed the team in the last season of their former affiliation with Milwaukee, Nashville ended the season in fourth place in the Southeastern Division with a 63–56 record. No playoffs were held to determine a league champion; instead, the team with the best regular-season record was declared the winner. Nashville placed ninth in the league standings. However, 10 games that had been postponed from the start of the season were reinserted into the schedule as a postseason tournament called the Triple-A Final Stretch in which all 30 Triple-A clubs competed for the highest winning percentage. Nashville finished the tournament tied for fourth place with a 7–2 record. Overall, they went 70–58.

In 2022, the Triple-A East became known as the International League, the name historically used by the regional circuit prior to the 2021 reorganization. Nashville began play in the renamed league with a 5–4 win against the Durham Bulls at First Horizon Park on April 5. The ballpark's single-game attendance record was set later that season when 12,409 people watched a game between Nashville and Memphis on July 16, a 10–0 loss. Sweet led the 2022 Sounds to win the Western Division title with a league-best 91–58 record. In a single playoff game to determine the International League championship, Nashville was shutout, 13–0, by Durham, winners of the Eastern Division. Sweet was chosen for the International League Manager of the Year Award. He also received the Mike Coolbaugh Award in honor of his work ethic, baseball knowledge, and player mentoring. The franchise was recognized with the Minor League Baseball Organization of the Year Award.

The International League began using a split-season format in 2023 in which the teams with the best league-wide records at the end of each half qualify for the playoffs. Nashville missed the first-half title by eight games, placing fifth at 40–34. Though posting the best second-half record in their division, the Sounds placed third in the league at 43–31, four-and-a-half games back. Overall, the team went 83–65. Robert Gasser won the International League Pitcher of the Year Award after pacing the league with 166 strikeouts and posting its second-lowest ERA (2.85). In 2024, Nashville tied for seventh place in the first-half with a 38–37 mark, 12 games out of first. They improved in the second-half but finished in third at 40–31, six-and-a-half games back. Their full season record was 78–68. Chad Patrick, winner of the IL Pitcher of the Year Award, led the circuit with 14 wins, a 2.90 ERA, and 145 strikeouts.

The Sounds ended the first half of the 2025 season atop their division at 44–29 but placed third in the league, two games back. On August 19, second baseman Raynel Delgado became the fourth Sound to hit for the cycle. The team finished the second half further back at 41–34 and posted an overall record of 85–63.

Nashville finished the first half of the 2026 season third in the International League at 43–32. Over a stretch of 15 days late in the season, Sounds pitchers threw two no-hitters on the road, including a perfect game. On August 23, Brandon Sproat and Tate Kuehner no-hit the Norfolk Tides in the first game of a seven-inning doubleheader for the eighth no-hitter in franchise history. Fifteen days later, Thomas Pannone pitched the franchise's third perfect game against the Durham Bulls. Pannone threw 94 pitches, the fewest needed in Nashville's three perfect games, and struck out eight batters on the way to accomplishing the fifth nine-inning complete perfect game in IL history. The Sounds placed lower in the second half at 37–37, giving them an overall record of 80–69. Over seven seasons as manager (2014, 2021–2026), Rick Sweet has won 564 games, placing him first on the all-time wins list for Sounds managers. Through six completed seasons of the current Brewers affiliation, Nashville has a 487–381 record. Through 48 full seasons of play, the Sounds have an all-time record of 3,612–3,344–2 encompassing all regular and postseason games over 49 years in Nashville.

== See also ==
- History of professional baseball in Nashville, Tennessee
