= Alec Zumwalt =

American baseball coach (born 1981)

Kansas City Royals – No. 37
- Coach
- Born: January 20, 1981 (age 45); Kingman, Arizona, U.S.
- Stats at Baseball Reference

Teams
- Kansas City Royals (2022–present)

Sean Alexander Zumwalt (born January 20, 1981) is an American professional baseball hitting coach for the Kansas City Royals of Major League Baseball.

Zumwalt attended East Forsyth High School in Kernersville, North Carolina, and played for the school's baseball team as an outfielder. He graduated in 1999. The Atlanta Braves selected him in the fourth round of the 1999 MLB draft. The Braves had Zumwalt convert into a pitcher before the 2002 season. After the 2003 season, the Tampa Bay Devil Rays selected Zumwalt from the Braves in the Rule 5 draft. The Rays returned Zumwalt to the Braves before the 2004 season began. After the 2004 season, the Braves traded Zumwalt and José Capellán to the Milwaukee Brewers for Dan Kolb. On July 15, 2006, Zumwalt combined with fellow Nashville Sounds pitchers Carlos Villanueva and Mike Meyers to throw a combined no-hitter against the Memphis Redbirds.

After his playing career, Zumwalt became a scout, and worked for the Kansas City Royals as their director of hitting performance and player development. On May 16, 2022, the Royals promoted Zumwalt to their major league coaching staff as their Senior Director of Hitting Performance, Major League hitting coach, replacing Terry Bradshaw.

== See also ==
- Rule 5 draft results
