= Carlos Villanueva (baseball) =

Dominican baseball player (born 1983)

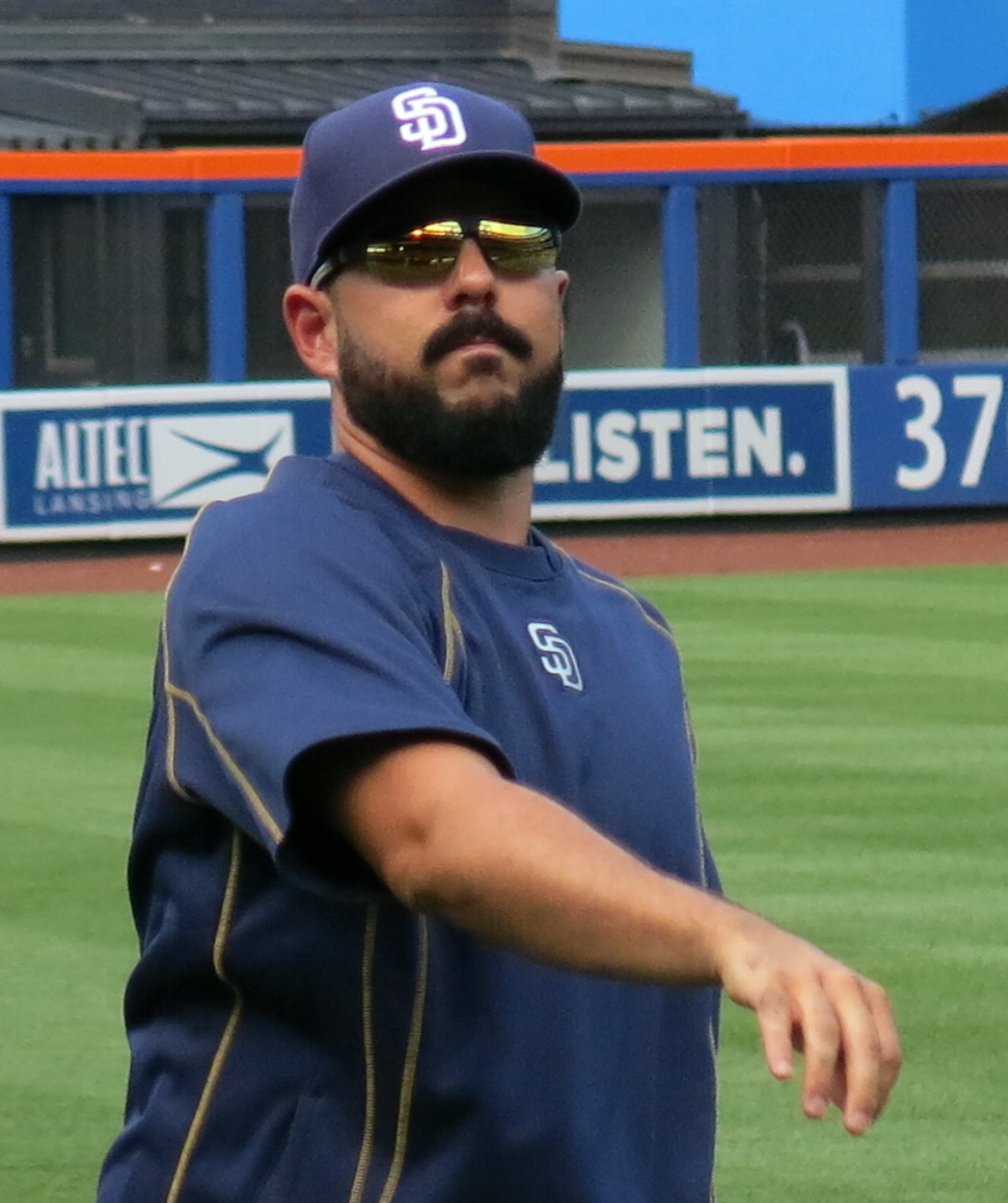
- Villanueva with the Padres in 2016
- Pitcher
- Born: November 28, 1983 (age 42); Santiago, Dominican Republic
- Batted: Right Threw: Right

Professional debut
- MLB: May 23, 2006, for the Milwaukee Brewers
- KBO: March 31, 2017, for the Hanwha Eagles

Last appearance
- MLB: September 24, 2016, for the San Diego Padres
- KBO: September 28, 2017, for the Hanwha Eagles

MLB statistics
- Win–loss record: 51–55
- Earned run average: 4.31
- Strikeouts: 862

KBO statistics
- Win–loss record: 5–7
- Earned run average: 4.18
- Strikeouts: 68
- Stats at Baseball Reference

Teams
- Milwaukee Brewers (2006–2010); Toronto Blue Jays (2011–2012); Chicago Cubs (2013–2014); St. Louis Cardinals (2015); San Diego Padres (2016); Hanwha Eagles (2017)

Carlos Manuel Villanueva Paulino (born November 28, 1983) is a Dominican former professional baseball pitcher. He played in Major League Baseball (MLB) for the Milwaukee Brewers, Toronto Blue Jays, Chicago Cubs, St. Louis Cardinals, and San Diego Padres. He also played in the KBO League for the Hanwha Eagles.

== Playing career ==
=== San Francisco Giants ===
Villanueva was signed by the San Francisco Giants on March 4, 2002. He made his professional debut with the rookie-level Arizona League Giants, posting a 4–0 record and 0.59 ERA with 23 strikeouts in 19 games. Villanueva returned to the AZL Giants in 2003, compiling a 3–6 record and 3.97 ERA with 67 strikeouts in 59 innings pitched across 12 games (10 starts).

=== Milwaukee Brewers ===
Villanueva and Glenn Woolard were traded to the Milwaukee Brewers on March 30, 2004, in exchange for pitchers Wayne Franklin and Leo Estrella. Villanueva subsequently joined the Beloit Snappers, the Brewers' Single-A affiliate.

As he worked his way through the Brewers' farm system, Villanueva was called up to the Brewers from Double-A Huntsville on May 22, 2006. He made his Major League debut against the Cincinnati Reds on May 23, 2006, pitching a scoreless inning. On July 15, 2006, Villanueva combined with fellow Nashville Sounds pitchers Mike Meyers and Alec Zumwalt to throw a combined no-hitter against the Memphis Redbirds. Villanueva was recalled again, making his first career major league start for the Brewers against the Cincinnati Reds.

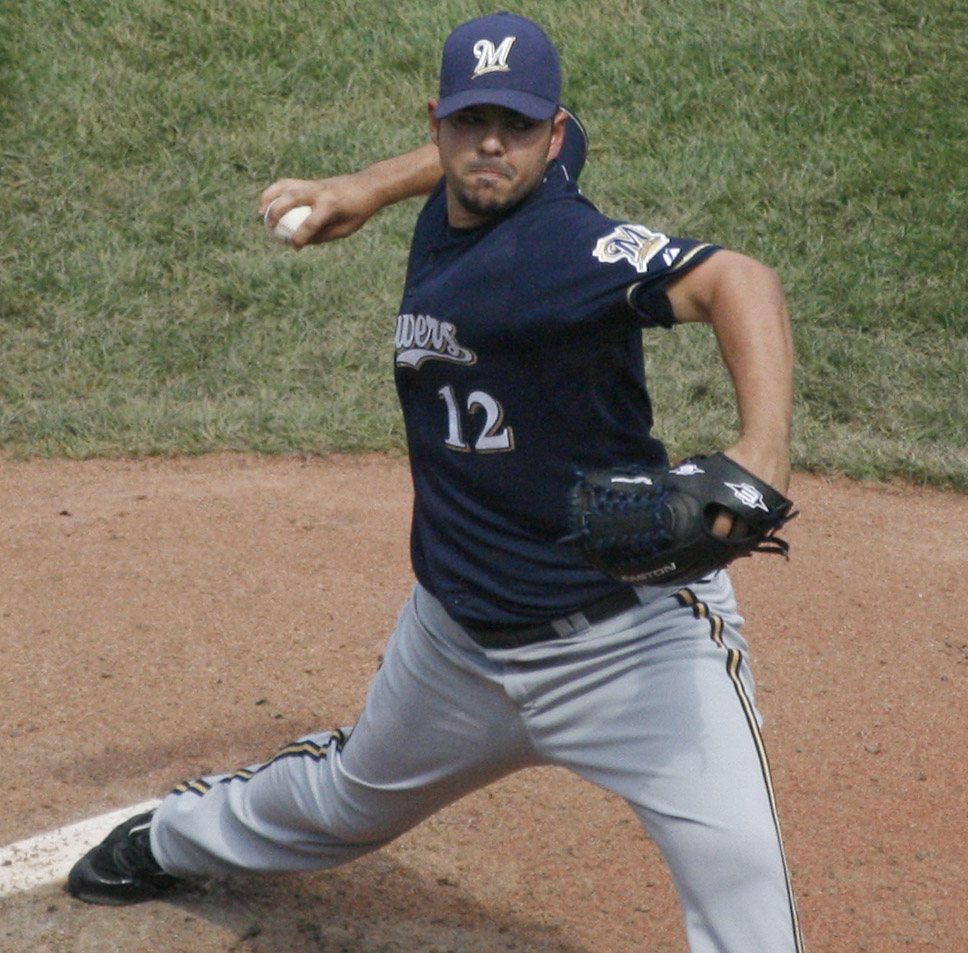
Villanueva pitching for the Milwaukee Brewers in 2009

After a successful 2006 campaign, Villanueva entered the 2007 spring training in competition for the Brewers fifth spot in the starting rotation. Despite pitching well, he lost the job to Claudio Vargas. Instead, manager Ned Yost elected to put Villanueva into the bullpen as a middle relief pitcher. Villanueva pitched well in his new role and was occasionally used as a long relief pitcher when Elmer Dessens was placed on the DL. On July 2, Villanueva had a 6–0 win–loss record with a 2.64 earned run average (ERA). Despite his record, Villanueva was accustomed to only being used as a starting pitcher, and had never appeared in more than 25 games in his professional career. Through July and August, he posted a 1–3 record with an ERA of over 9, perhaps a sign of being overworked. Despite his struggles, he was still being used as a middle relief pitcher. On August 20, after pitching 3 perfect innings against the Arizona Diamondbacks and picking up his first career save, he was optioned to the Triple-A Nashville Sounds to make two starts to "polish up" for a September call up when the rosters expand.

Villanueva spent a short part of the 2009 season as the closer while Trevor Hoffman recovered on the disabled list; however, after poor performances, the role was given to Todd Coffey instead.

=== Toronto Blue Jays ===
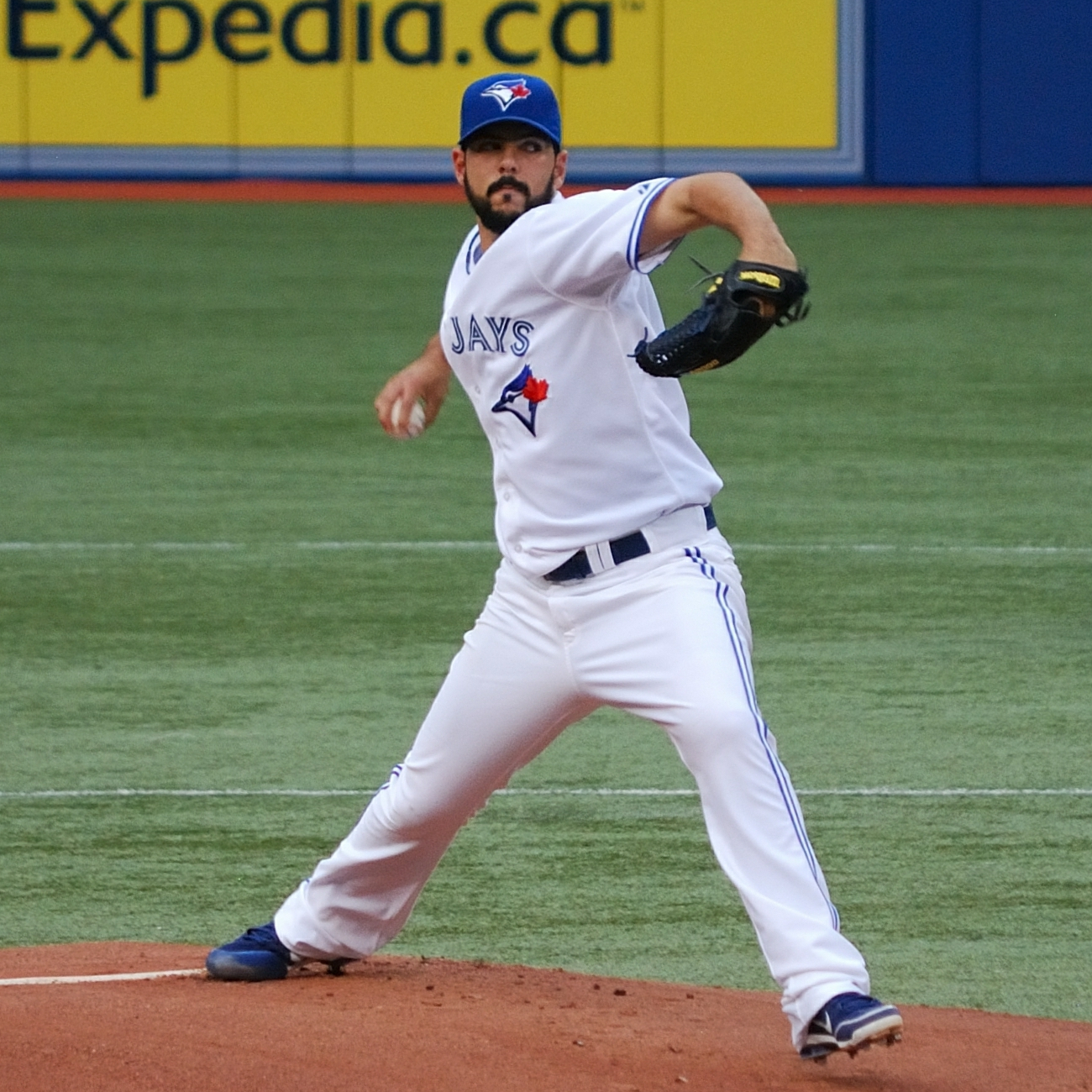
Villanueva with the Toronto Blue Jays in 2012

On December 3, 2010, Villanueva was traded to the Toronto Blue Jays for a player to be named later (cash).

After starting the season in the bullpen for the Blue Jays, he was moved to a position in the starting rotation to fill in for open spots previously filled by Brett Cecil and Jesse Litsch. On August 4, 2011, Villanueva was placed on the 15-day disabled list with a right forearm strain. Villanueva was re-activated from the disabled list on August 31. Brian Tallet was designated for assignment to make room for Villanueva. Villanueva began the 2012 season as the long reliever in the Jays' bullpen, but was promoted to a starter after numerous injuries to the pitching staff. After posting a 6–1 record, Villanueva left the team for personal reasons on August 5. J. A. Happ started in place of Villanueva. He became a free agent following the season.

=== Chicago Cubs ===
On December 19, 2012, it was reported that Villanueva had agreed a two-year, $10 million contract with the Chicago Cubs. The deal became official on January 26, 2013, more than a month after it was initially agreed upon. Lendy Castillo was designated for assignment to make room for Villanueva on the 40-man roster. Dale Sveum made Villanueva the Cubs fifth starter in their rotation. His first game on April 6, a road game against the Atlanta Braves, resulted in a no decision. He became a free agent following the 2014 season.

=== St. Louis Cardinals ===
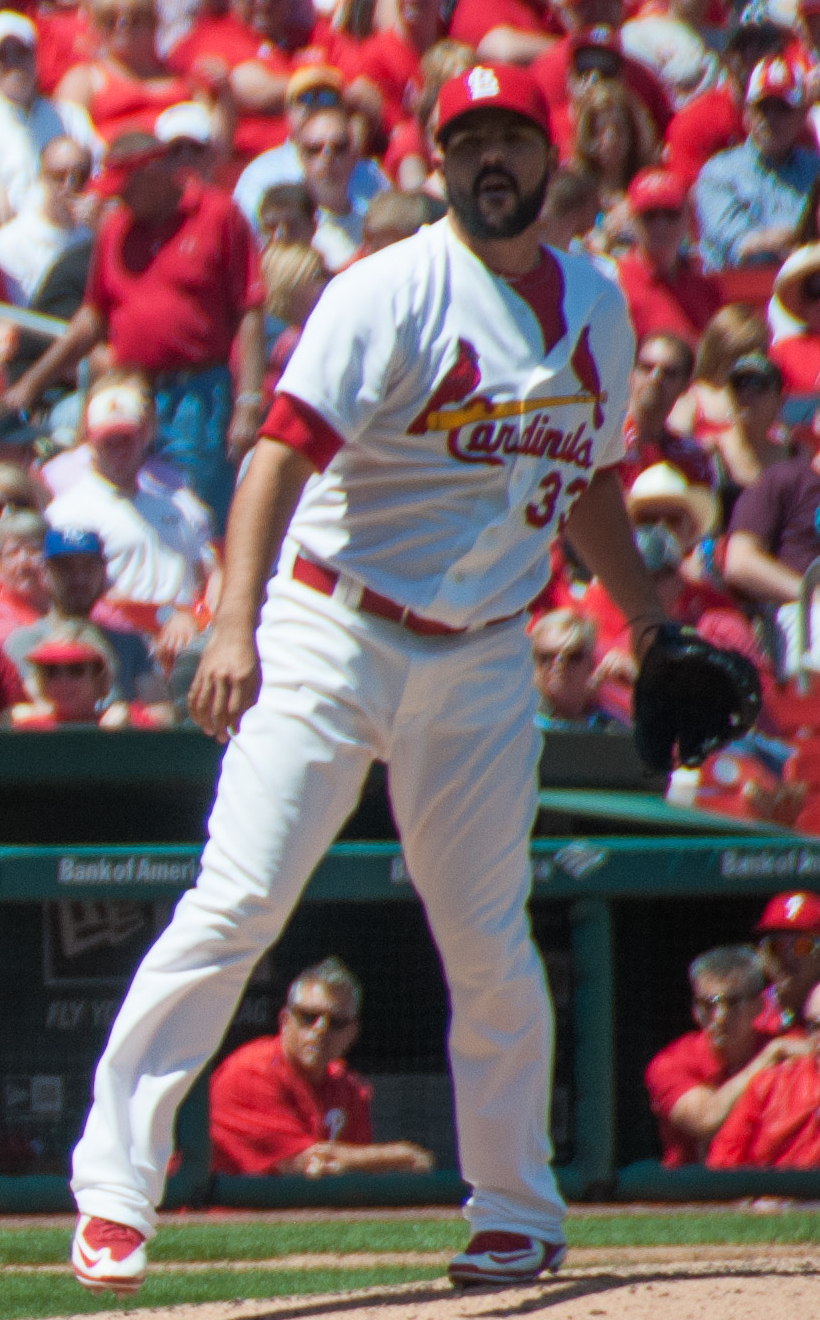
Villanueva with the Cardinals in 2015

On February 4, 2015, the St. Louis Cardinals signed Villanueva to a minor league contract that included an invitation to spring training. The Cardinals added him to their 40-man roster on March 30. On June 27, he pitched the last three innings of an 8–1 victory over the Cubs for his first save of the season, and did so again on August 7 against the Brewers in a 6–0 win. It was his fourth and fifth career save of at least three innings. Villanueva pitched solely out of the bullpen in 2015 and was credited with a 4–3 record with two saves, 55 strikeouts, and 50 hits and 21 walks allowed. He posted career-bests in ERA (2.95) and inherited runners strand rate (80.5 percent); the WHIP (1.16), batting average on balls in play (.265) and batting average against (.220) were his best figures since his first MLB season with the Brewers. He became a free agent following the season.

=== San Diego Padres ===
On January 13, 2016, the San Diego Padres signed Villanueva to a one-year, $1.5 million contract. In 51 appearances for San Diego, Villanueva registered a 2–2 record and 5.96 ERA with 61 strikeouts across 74 innings pitched.

=== Hanwha Eagles ===
On February 24, 2017, Villanueva signed with the Hanwha Eagles of the KBO League. In 20 starts for the Eagles, he compiled a 5–7 record and 4.18 ERA with 68 strikeouts across 112 innings of work. Villanueva became a free agent following the season.

== Coaching career ==
On February 5, 2025, Villanueva was hired as part of the Milwaukee Brewers' player development staff under the role of Special Assistant to the General Manager/Player Development.
