= Mike Meyers (pitcher) =

Canadian baseball player (born 1977)

- Pitcher
- Born: October 18, 1977 (age 48); London, Ontario, Canada
- Bats: Right Throws: Right
- Stats at Baseball Reference
Medals
Men's baseball
Representing Canada
Pan American Games
Bronze medal – third place	1999 Winnipeg	Team

Michael Gregory Meyers (born October 18, 1977) is a Canadian former professional baseball pitcher who played in the Chicago Cubs, New York Mets, and Milwaukee Brewers organizations from 1997 to 2006.

In 1999, he was named to the Florida State League All-Star team as a starting pitcher. He competed for the Canadian national baseball team in the 2006 World Baseball Classic. On July 15, 2006, Meyers combined with fellow Nashville Sounds pitchers Carlos Villanueva and Alec Zumwalt to pitch the fifth no-hitter in team history, a 2–0 win over the Memphis Redbirds.
