= History of professional baseball in Nashville, Tennessee =

History of the city's professional baseball teams

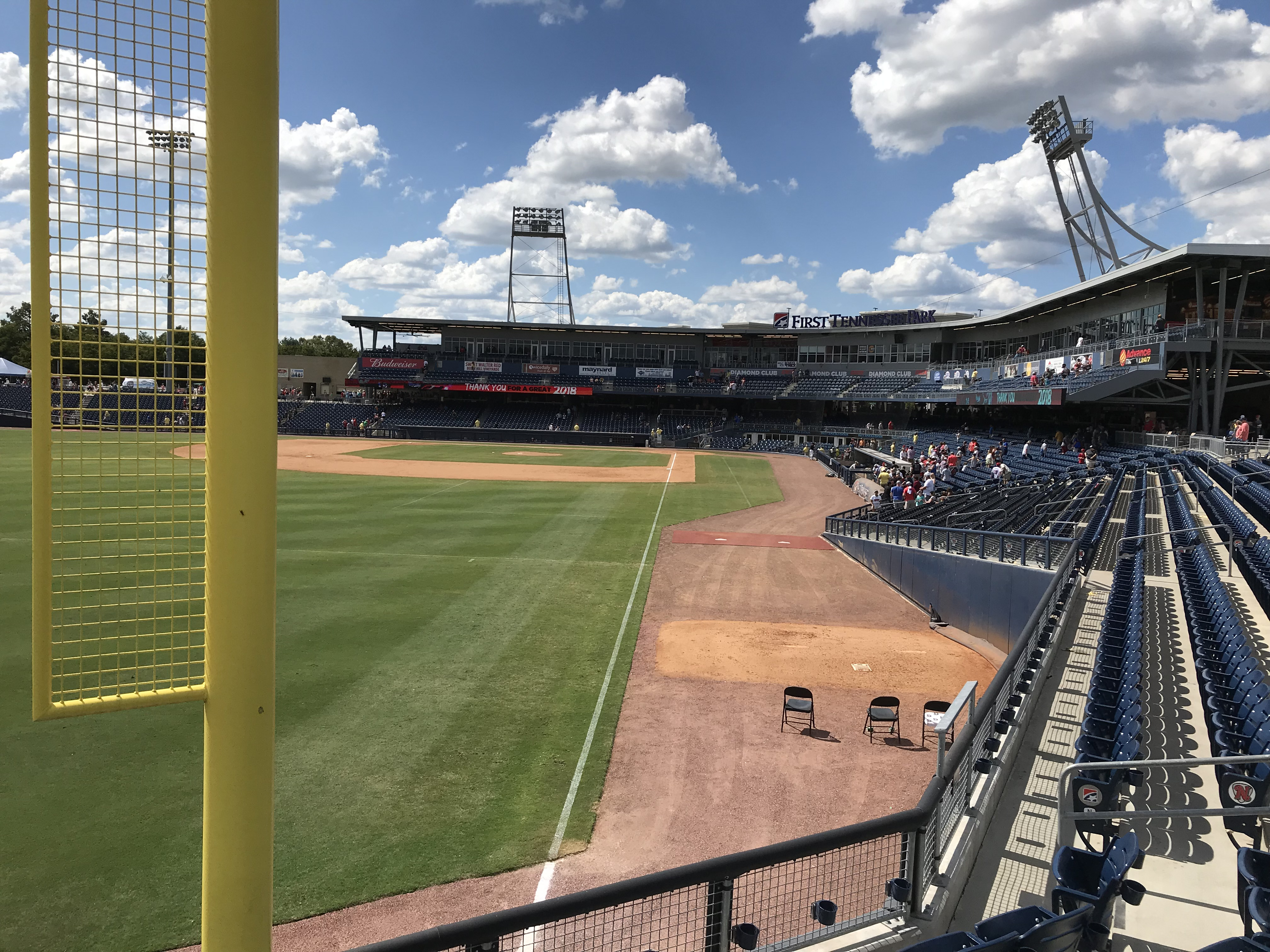
First Horizon Park, located at the site of the historic Sulphur Dell ballpark, has been home to the Nashville Sounds since 2015.

Nashville, Tennessee, has hosted Minor League Baseball (MiLB) teams since the late 19th century but has never been home to a Major League Baseball (MLB) team. The city's professional baseball history dates back to 1884 with the formation of the Nashville Americans, who were charter members of the original Southern League in 1885 and played their home games at Sulphur Spring Park, later renamed Athletic Park and Sulphur Dell. This ballpark was the home of Nashville's minor league teams through 1963. Of the numerous clubs to play there, the best-known and longest-operating was the Nashville Vols, who competed from 1901 to 1963, primarily in the Southern Association.

Following the loss of the Vols and the subsequent demolition of Sulphur Dell, Music City was without a professional baseball team for 14 years until 1978 when the Nashville Sounds, then a Double-A team that moved up to Triple-A in 1985, began play at Herschel Greer Stadium. The Sounds left Greer in 2015 for First Tennessee Park, now known as First Horizon Park, a new facility built on the site of the historic Sulphur Dell, where they continue as the oldest active professional sports franchise in Nashville.

Several Negro league teams were also based in Nashville, playing at Sulphur Dell as well as Greenwood Park and Tom Wilson Park, from 1920 to 1951. Among these were the Nashville Elite Giants, who played 15 seasons in the city, including six seasons in leagues that were retroactively granted major league status by MLB in 2020.

Despite efforts to bring Major League Baseball to Nashville, most prominently in the 1993 MLB expansion process, the city has been unsuccessful in its attempts to gain a major league team. An effort is being made to either land a future expansion team or lure an existing team to Nashville with the promise of a new major league facility.

== Minor League Baseball ==
=== Early teams (1884–1897) ===
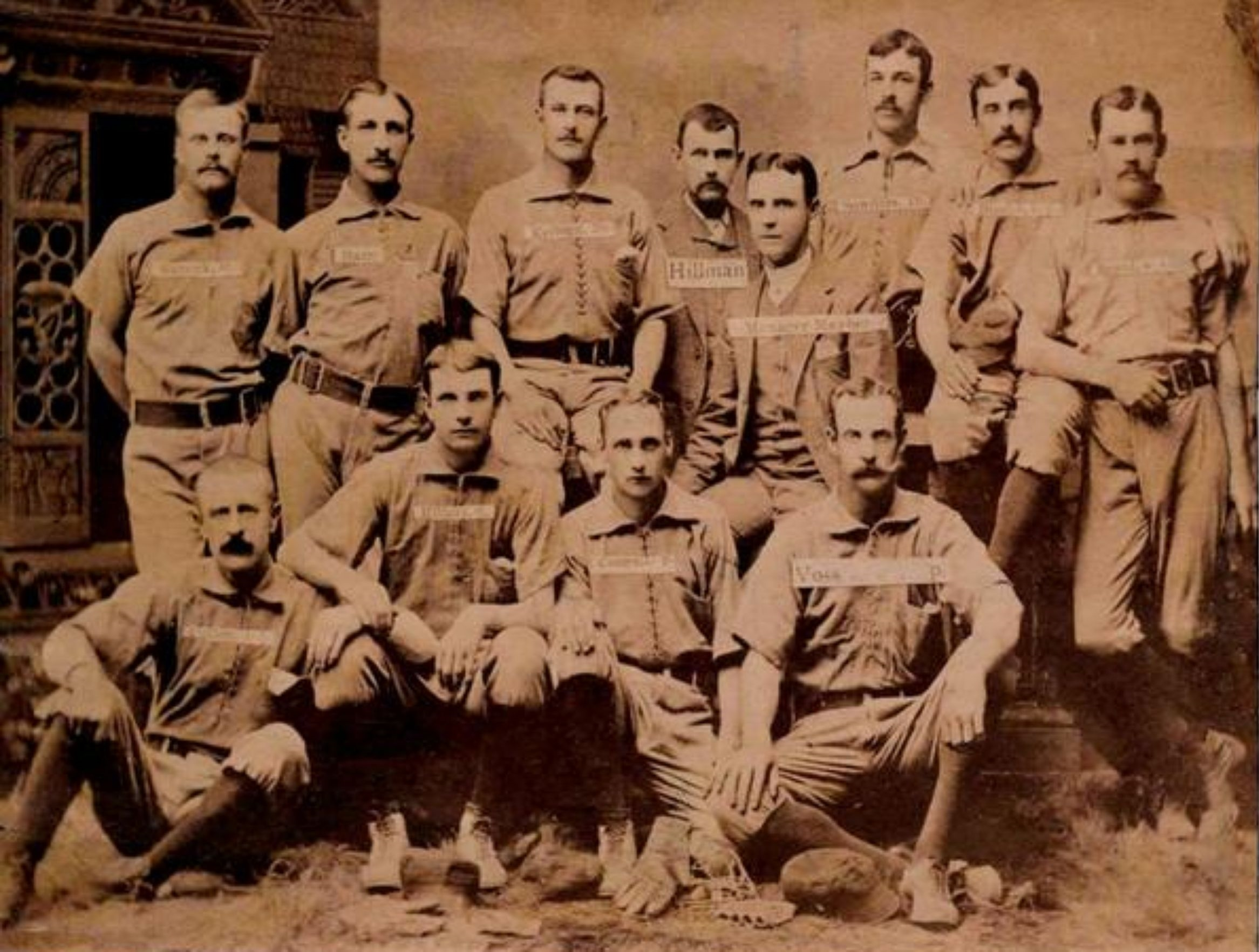
The Nashville Americans (1885) were the city's first professional baseball team.

Amateur teams first played baseball in Nashville, Tennessee, in the late 1860s. On October 6, 1884, local investors met to establish the city's first professional baseball team, the Nashville Americans. Following a failed bid to join the major league Union Association, the Americans instead became charter members of the original Southern League, in which they competed in 1885 and 1886. They played their home games at Sulphur Spring Park, later renamed Athletic Park and Sulphur Dell, which was the home of the city's minor league teams through 1963.

Nashville's Southern League entry in 1887 was called the Nashville Blues. After losing nearly US$18,000, the team's directors chose to cut their losses and withdraw from the circuit some two months before the season's end. Nashville did not field another professional baseball club for the next five years until the Nashville Tigers joined the Southern League in 1893. The Tigers faced similar financial difficulties and surrendered the franchise to the league, which continued to operate it for the last three weeks of the season. Their 1894 campaign came to an abrupt midseason end as the result of league-wide financial instability.

The Nashville Seraphs replaced the Tigers in 1895. The Seraphs and Atlanta Crackers ended the season tied for first place, and each asserted to be the rightful pennant winners. At the Southern League's annual winter meeting that December, nearly four months later, Nashville was declared the champion for 1895. Despite winning the city's first professional baseball title, the Seraphs declined to participate in 1896 when another of the league's club refused to put up its monetary guarantee to finish the season. Two years later, in 1897, the Nashville Centennials were formed as members of the Central League. Financial problems necessitated the team's transfer to Henderson, Kentucky, just over a month into the season, and the league collapsed shortly thereafter.

=== Vols (1901–1963) ===
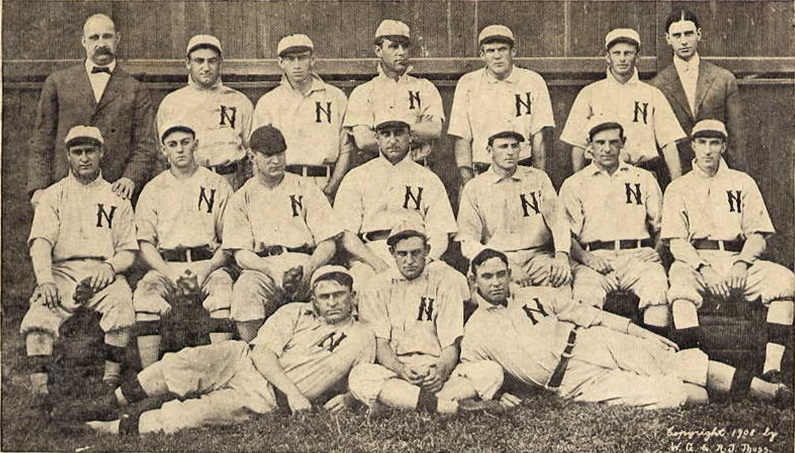
The Nashville Vols (1908), won eight Southern Association pennants, nine playoff championships, and four Dixie Series titles over 62 seasons from 1901 to 1963.

The Nashville Vols, the city's longest-operating baseball team, played 62 seasons from 1901 to 1963. First known only as the Nashville Baseball Club, they were formed as a charter member of the newly organized Southern Association in 1901. The team did not receive its official moniker, the Nashville Volunteers (regularly shortened to Vols), until 1908. Their last season in the Southern Association was 1961. They were inactive in 1962 due to the Southern Association ceasing operations after the 1961 season and their inability to obtain a major league working agreement required for membership in another league. Nashville returned for a final campaign as a part of the South Atlantic League in 1963 before financial problems resulted in the board of directors surrendering the franchise to the league.

The Vols were affiliated with six Major League Baseball teams across 27 seasons and were unaffiliated in the other 35. Their longest affiliation was with the Chicago Cubs for nine seasons (1943–1951), followed by the Cincinnati Reds (8 seasons; 1936–1937, 1955–1960), New York Giants (5 seasons; 1934–1935, 1952–1954), Brooklyn Dodgers (3 seasons; 1938–1940), and one season each with the Minnesota Twins (1961) and Los Angeles Angels (1963). The Vols won eight Southern Association pennants (1901, 1902, 1908, 1916, 1940, 1943, 1948, 1949), nine playoff championships (1939, 1940, 1941, 1942, 1943, 1944, 1949, 1950, 1953), and four Dixie Series titles (1940, 1941, 1942, 1949).

=== Sounds (1978–present) ===
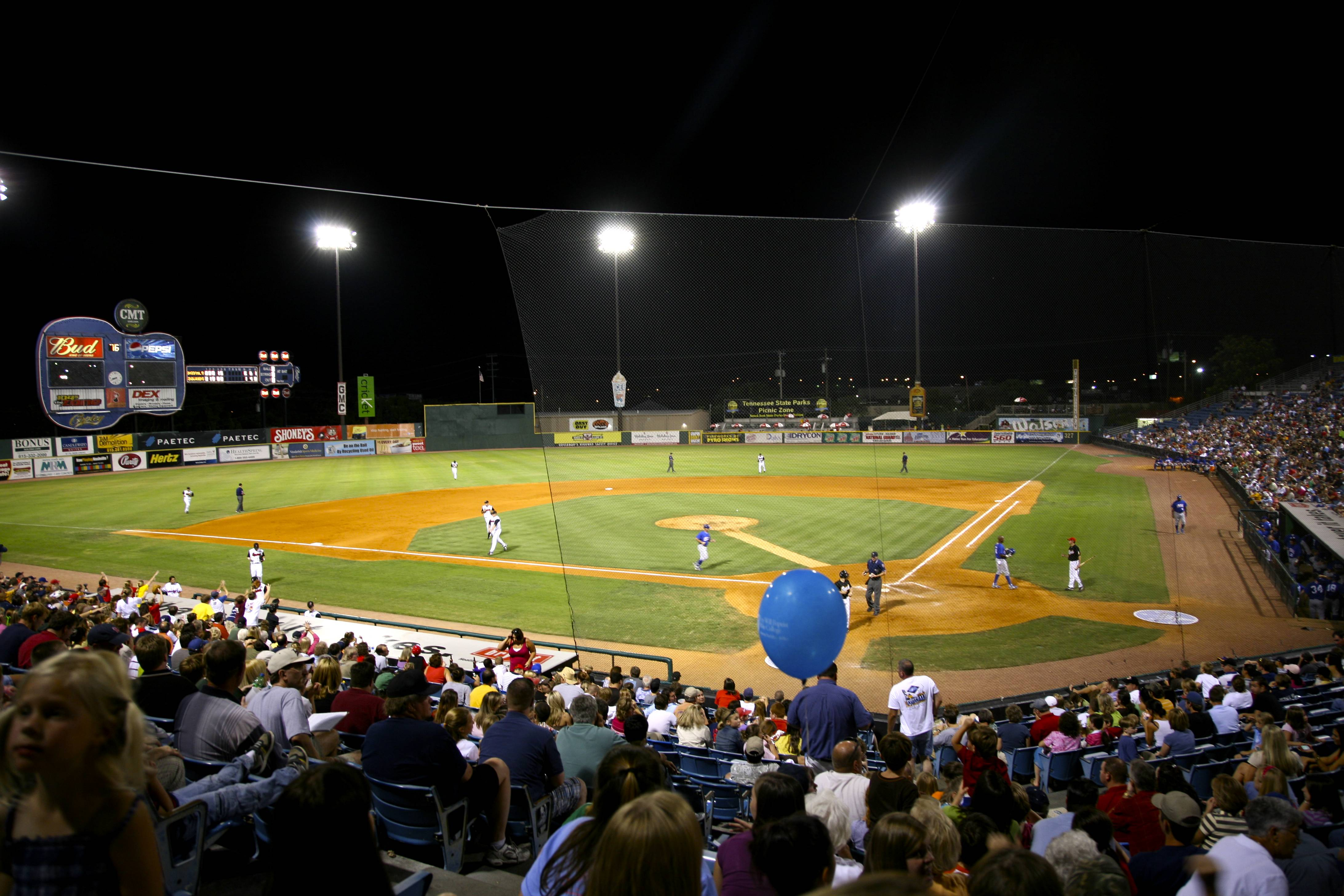
The Nashville Sounds played at Greer Stadium for 37 seasons from 1978 to 2014 before moving into a new ballpark.

Music City was without a professional baseball team for 14 years after the loss of the Vols. That changed in 1978 when Larry Schmittou and a group of investors purchased the rights to operate an expansion franchise of the Double-A Southern League called the Nashville Sounds. The Sounds played their home games at Herschel Greer Stadium, a new ballpark located on the grounds of Fort Negley. Nashville led all of Minor League Baseball in attendance in their inaugural season and continued to draw the Southern League's largest crowds in each of their seven years as members of the league. The Double-A Sounds had affiliations with the Cincinnati Reds (1978–1979) and New York Yankees (1980–1984). The team won six consecutive second-half division titles from 1979 to 1984 and won the Southern League championship in 1979 and 1982.

In an effort to position Nashville to contend for an MLB franchise in the future, Schmittou and team owners purchased the Triple-A Evansville Triplets of the American Association and relocated the team to Nashville before the 1985 season. The Triple-A Sounds carried on the history of the Double-A team that preceded them. They rarely contended for the American Association championship, making only three appearances in the postseason over their 13 years in the league. During this period, Nashville was affiliated with the Detroit Tigers (1985–1986), Cincinnati Reds (1987–1992), and Chicago White Sox (1993–1997).

The Sounds became members of the Triple-A Pacific Coast League in 1998 following the dissolution of the American Association after the end of the previous season. They were affiliates of the Pittsburgh Pirates (1998–2004), Milwaukee Brewers (2005–2014), Oakland Athletics (2015–2018), and Texas Rangers (2019–2020). Over 23 years in the league, the team qualified for the playoffs on five occasions. They won their lone Pacific Coast League championship in 2005. The Sounds left Greer Stadium in 2015 for First Horizon Park, then known as First Tennessee Park, a new facility built on the site of the former Sulphur Dell in downtown Nashville.

In conjunction with Major League Baseball's reorganization of the minor leagues in 2021, Nashville was placed in the Triple-A East, which became the International League in 2022. They have been the Triple-A affiliate of the Milwaukee Brewers since 2021. Nashville has made one appearance in the International League playoffs but has not won its championship. The Sounds are the oldest active professional sports franchise in Nashville, predating the Nashville Predators (1998), Tennessee Titans (1999), and Nashville SC (2018).

=== Xpress (1993–1994) ===
Nashville hosted two minor league teams during the 1993 and 1994 seasons as the city became a temporary home to the Nashville Xpress, a displaced Southern League team previously known as the Charlotte Knights. This came about after the 1992 season when Charlotte, North Carolina, acquired a Triple-A expansion team in the International League, leaving the Southern League franchise in need of a new home. Larry Schmittou, president of the Triple-A Nashville club, offered to let the displaced team play at Greer Stadium until a permanent home could be found. Schmittou and the Sounds' staff served as caretakers of the team, which was the Double-A affiliate of the Minnesota Twins. To accommodate an additional club at Greer, the Xpress' home games were scheduled for during the Sounds' road trips. They left Nashville to play on an interim basis in Wilmington, North Carolina, where they were known as the Port City Roosters in 1995 and 1996. The franchise eventually landed in Mobile, Alabama, as the Mobile BayBears in 1997.

== Negro leagues ==
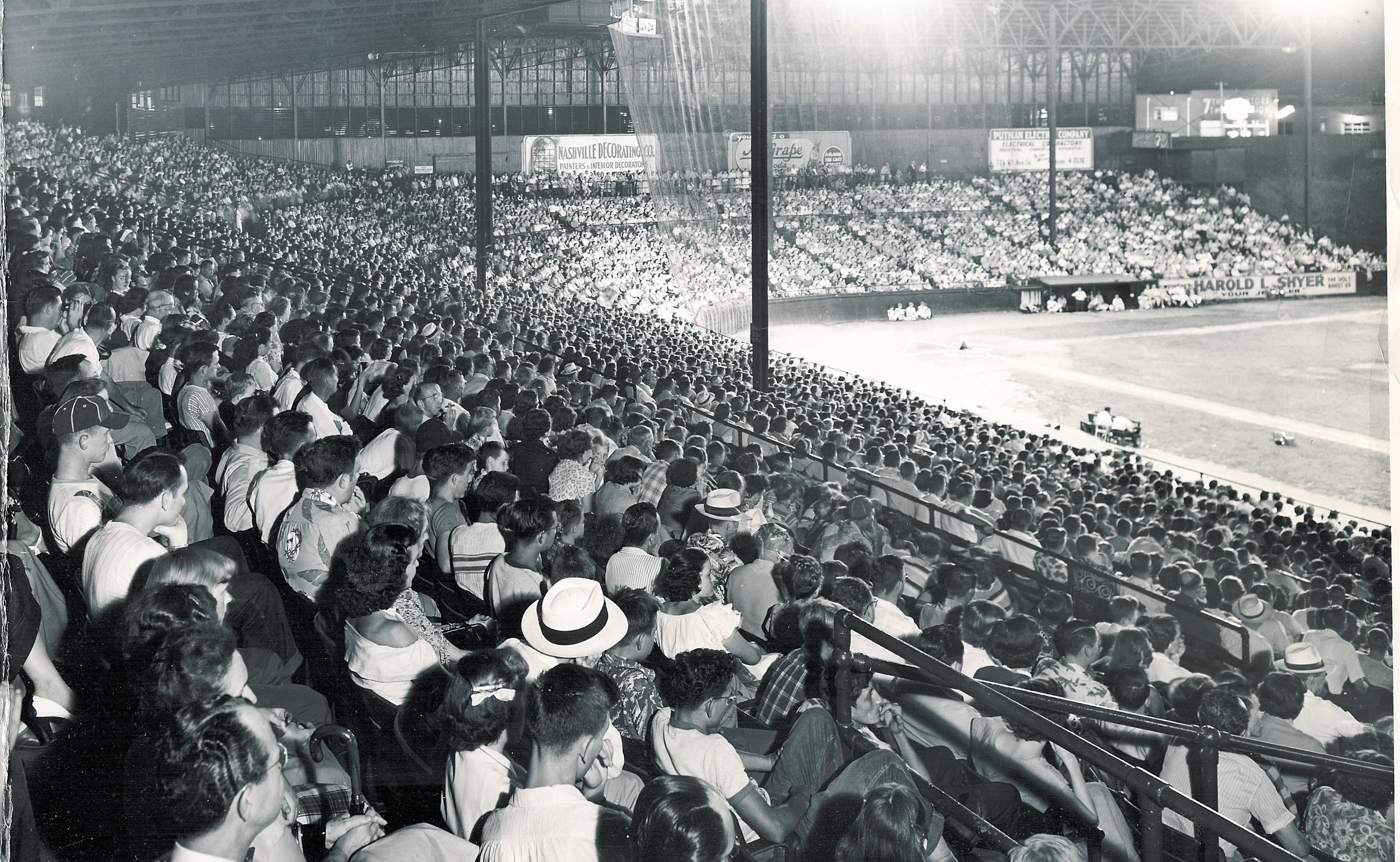
Nashville's Negro league teams played at Sulphur Dell in addition to other parks.

Several Negro league baseball teams hailed from Nashville between 1920 and 1951. The first such club was the Nashville White Sox, who were charter members of the Negro Southern League (NSL) in 1920. They played their home games at Sulphur Dell.

Perhaps Nashville's best-known Negro team was the Nashville Elite Giants, who played in the city from 1921 to 1935 as members of the Negro Southern League (1921–1923, 1926–1927, 1929, 1931–1932) and Negro National League (NNL) (1930, 1933–1935), and also operated independently (1924–1925, 1928). The Elites played at Sulphur Dell, Greenwood Park, and Tom Wilson Park, built by team owner Thomas T. Wilson in 1929. Wilson relocated the team to Columbus, Ohio, during the 1935 season, becoming the Columbus Elite Giants. While in Nashville, the team won four Negro Southern League championships (1921, 1922, 1929, 1931). In 2020, Major League Baseball retroactively granted major league status to the NNL and NSL for certain seasons, elevating the Elite Giants to a major league team in 1929 (as associate members of the NNL), 1930, and from 1932 to 1935.

The city was home to the Nashville Stars of the Negro Major League in 1942. This team, or another bearing the same name, also competed in the NSL in 1950 and 1951 at Sulphur Dell. Finally, the Nashville Black Vols began playing at the Dell in 1945 as members of the NSL. They became known as the Nashville Cubs in 1946 and split part of the 1950 season between Nashville and Louisville, Kentucky, where they competed as the Louisville Cubs, before playing their final season in 1951.

== Major League Baseball ==
Though several attempts have been made to either secure membership in a major league or earn a Major League Baseball (MLB) expansion franchise, Nashville has never had an MLB team.

=== 1885 Union Association ===
The Union Association, one of three major leagues in operation in 1884, considered the Nashville Americans for membership in its 1885 season. On October 10, President Henry Lucas came to Nashville to meet with the team's directors and survey the prospect of major league baseball in the city. That afternoon at the Nashville Fairgrounds, the Americans played their first exhibition game against one of the association's top teams, the Cincinnati Outlaw Reds. The Nashvilles lost both that afternoon's game and a second game the next day. With the possibility of Union Association membership looking dim, the Americans opted instead to join the newly organized Southern League in 1885. The Union Association disbanded before the 1885 season.

=== 1993 MLB expansion ===
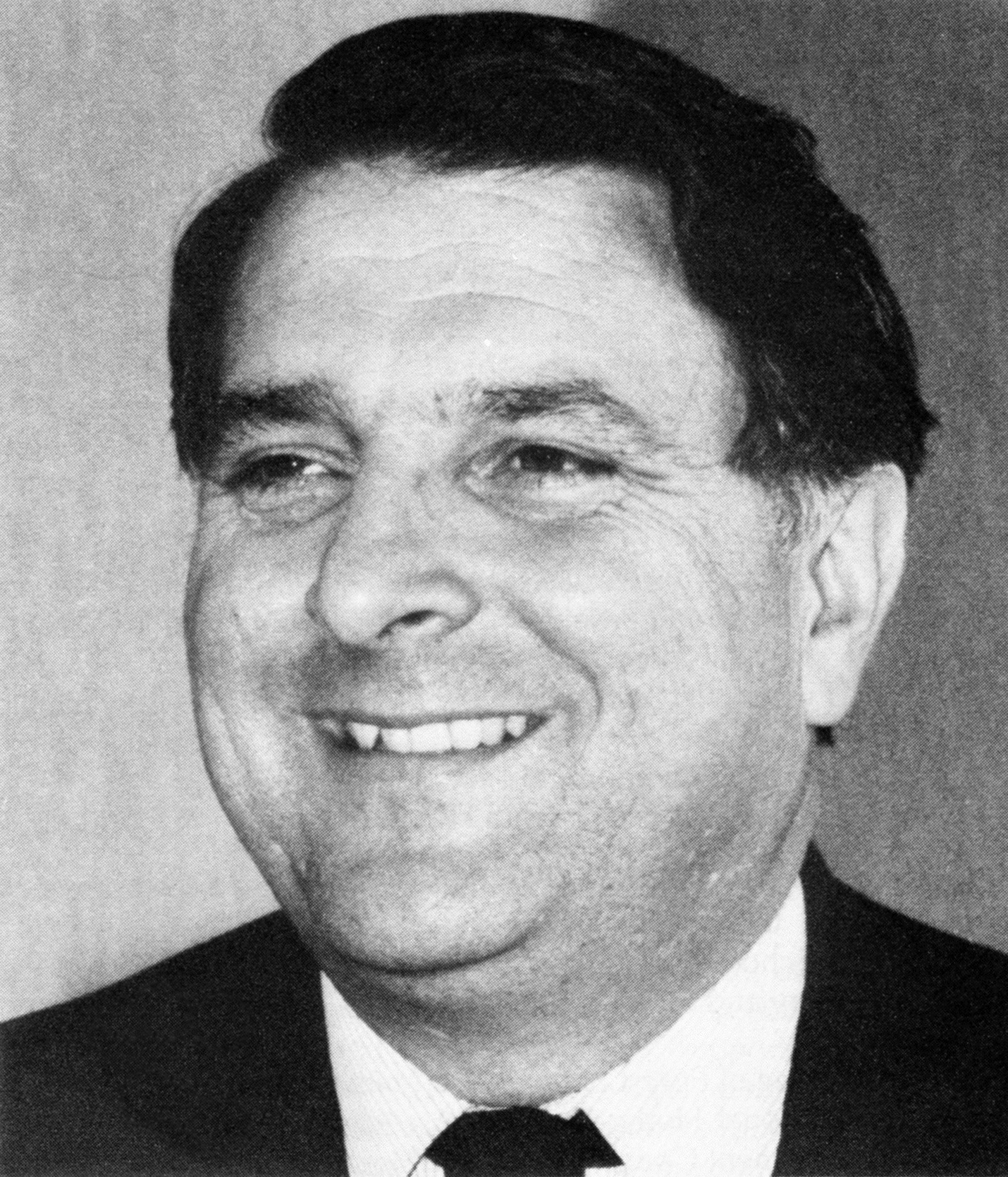
Larry Schmittou led Nashville's bid for a Major League Baseball team in the 1993 expansion.

Sounds president Larry Schmittou, who was also vice president of marketing and administration for the Texas Rangers, believed in 1983 that Nashville was a viable candidate to land a Major League Baseball team either through expansion or the relocation of an existing franchise.

In November 1985, a delegation from Nashville was one of 12 groups to make presentations to MLB owners and commissioner Peter Ueberroth regarding the viability of expansion in their cities. The delegation, which included Schmittou, Governor Lamar Alexander, and Mayor Richard Fulton, were encouraged with their reception but were concerned that people may not know Nashville well enough to make it a strong contender. The Governor's Commission on Major League Baseball entrusted Schmittou and other Sounds owners, including country musicians Conway Twitty, Larry Gatlin, Richard Sterban, Jerry Reed, and Cal Smith, with ownership of a potential franchise and responsibility for the financial requirement set forth by the expansion committee. Schmittou launched a drive to pre-sell 10,000 season tickets, which was met and exceeded.

In June 1990, MLB announced its intentions to add two new National League teams in a 1993 expansion. Joining Nashville in competition for these two spots were Buffalo, New York; Charlotte, North Carolina; Denver, Colorado; Miami, Florida; Orlando, Florida; Phoenix, Arizona; Sacramento, California; St. Petersburg, Florida; Tampa, Florida; Vancouver, British Columbia; and Washington, D.C. Schmittou gave a formal presentation to the National League Expansion Committee in September 1990. His plan for MLB in Nashville included a proposed $40-million ballpark to be built at the convergence of Interstate 24 and Briley Parkway that would have included a 150-foot (46 m) scoreboard shaped like the neck of a guitar and seated 40,000 people. Along with the submission of a 120-page proposal, the committee was shown a video narrated by Country Music Hall of Fame member Eddy Arnold, which extolled the suitability of Nashville for a major league team. On December 18, the committee released a short list of six finalist candidates—Nashville was not included. The two new franchises were eventually awarded to Denver (the Colorado Rockies) and Miami (the Florida Marlins).

=== 1998 MLB expansion ===
After the failed 1993 expansion bid, Schmittou felt the lack of a major league stadium significantly hurt Nashville's MLB viability. He intended to reapply in the next round of expansion if a plan for a ballpark was in place. Having no such plan for a stadium by the August 11, 1994, deadline for application for the 1998 MLB expansion, Schmittou did not apply. The Nashville Sports Council requested an application from the expansion committee but did not complete and return the packet. Franchises were awarded to Phoenix (the Arizona Diamondbacks) and Tampa Bay (the Tampa Bay Devil Rays).

=== Future expansion ===
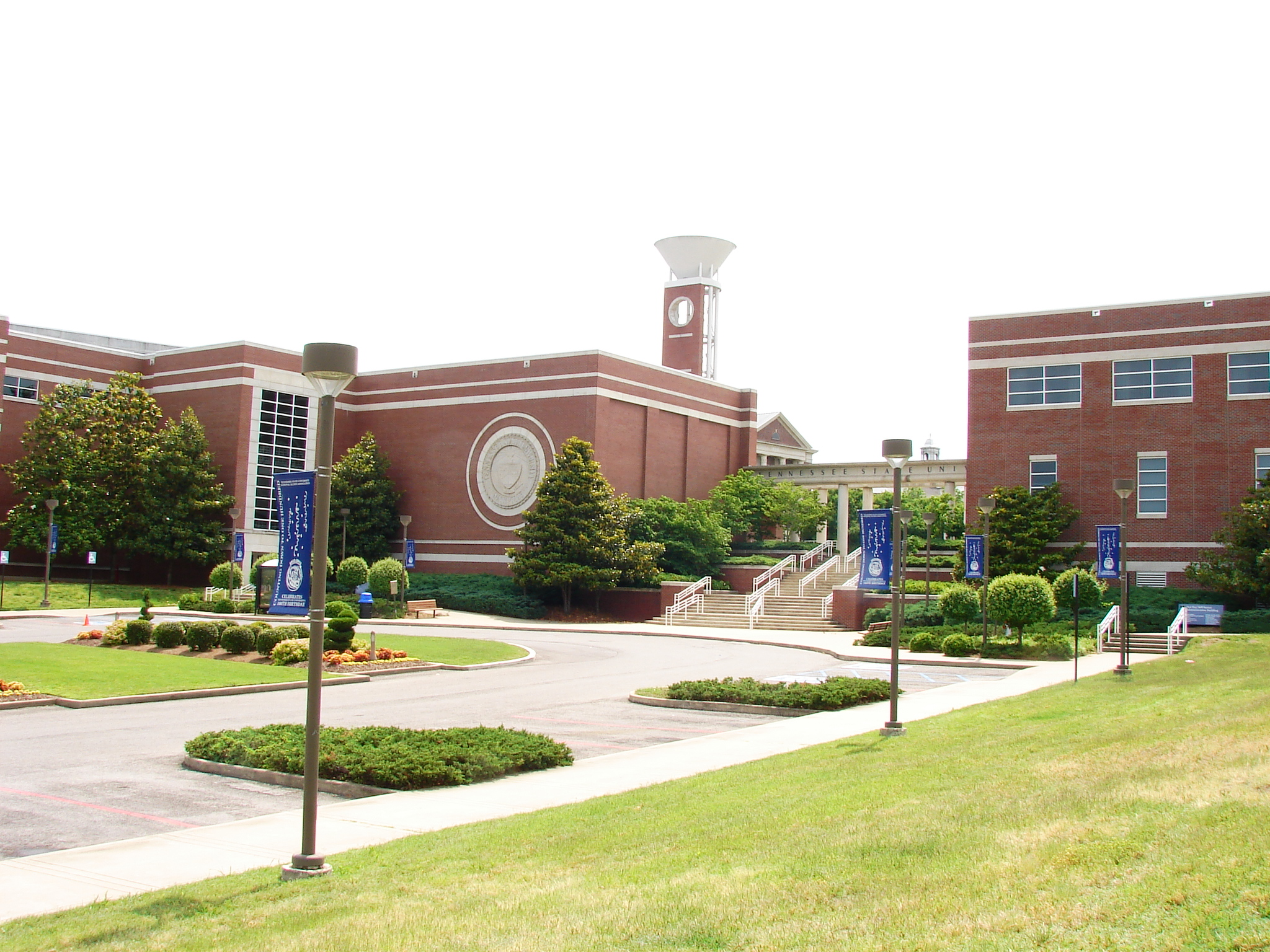
A proposed MLB ballpark could be built on the campus of Tennessee State University in West Nashville.

Though Major League Baseball has not announced plans regarding future expansion, Nashville has been one of several cities mentioned by commissioner Rob Manfred as potential locations for expansion when it should happen.

In January 2019, businessman John Loar announced plans to spearhead the next attempt at bringing an MLB expansion franchise to Nashville. He subsequently formed Music City Baseball to pursue this plan. The group includes Loar, former United States Attorney General Alberto Gonzales, Vanderbilt Commodores baseball head coach Tim Corbin, retired MLB pitcher Dave Stewart, manager Tony La Russa, executive Dave Dombrowski, musicians Justin Timberlake and Darius Rucker, and former Tennessee Titan Eddie George. In April 2022, Stewart was appointed to lead Music City Baseball.

Key difficulties facing the proposal include a lack of capital funds to build a ballpark and pay an MLB enfranchisement fee, obtaining the land on which to build as former Mayor John Cooper said the city would not pay for the facility, and the presence of the Nashville Sounds. The Nashville baseball territory is controlled by the Sounds, so Music City Baseball would have to buy them out. Sounds co-owner Frank Ward has said he would relocate his team if MLB came to Nashville rather than try to coexist in the same market. This leads to the problem of what to do with the Sounds' First Horizon Park, which is owned by the city and will not be paid off until 2043.

If an expansion team was awarded to Music City Baseball, it would be called the Nashville Stars in homage to the Negro leagues and the team of the same name that hailed from Nashville. The group entered into a licensing agreement with the Negro Leagues Baseball Museum, which includes revenue sharing, a potential physical location in their ballpark, and the rights to use the Stars' name and related photographs and artifacts. While a location has not been secured for a potential stadium, the group has considered the campus of Tennessee State University in West Nashville as a potential site.

== See also ==
- List of baseball parks in Nashville, Tennessee
