= List of baseball parks in Nashville, Tennessee =

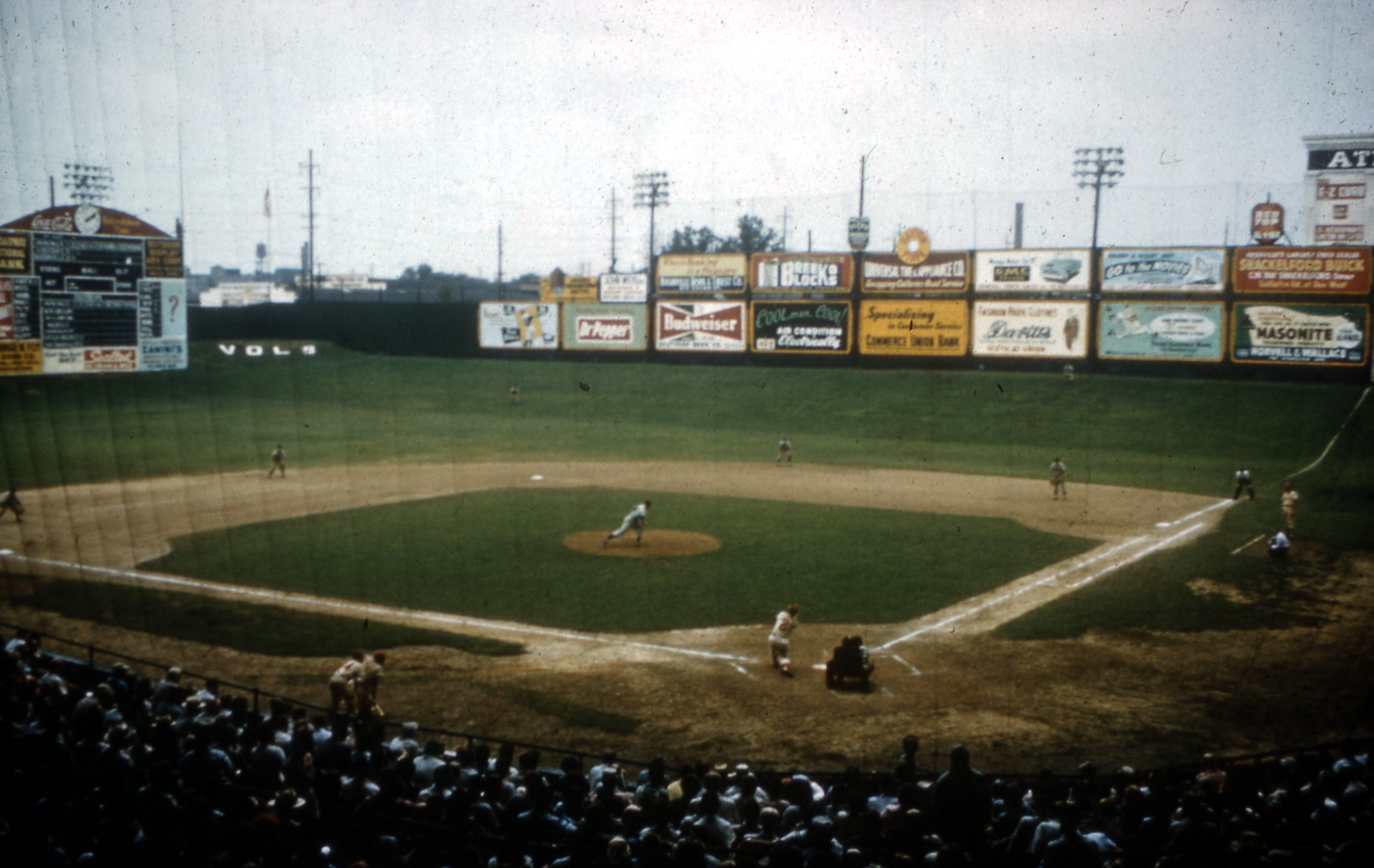
Sulphur Dell was home to Nashville's minor league teams from 1885 to 1963.

Nashville, Tennessee, has hosted professional baseball teams since the late 19th century at five ballparks around the city. The first was Sulphur Spring Park, later renamed Athletic Park but best known as Sulphur Dell, which was the home of the city's minor league teams from 1885 to 1963. It was located just north of the Tennessee State Capitol in downtown Nashville. The facility was demolished in 1969.

A number of Negro league teams competed at Sulphur Dell as well as at Greenwood Park, located across from Greenwood Cemetery, and Tom Wilson Park, north of the Nashville Fairgrounds, both of which were in Nashville's black communities and have since been demolished.

Herschel Greer Stadium was built in 1978 on the grounds of Fort Negley just south of downtown. Greer served as the home of the Nashville Sounds for 37 seasons until they left for the new First Horizon Park, then known as First Tennessee Park, located at the site of Sulphur Dell, in 2015. Greer was demolished in 2019.

== Baseball parks ==
=== Sulphur Dell ===
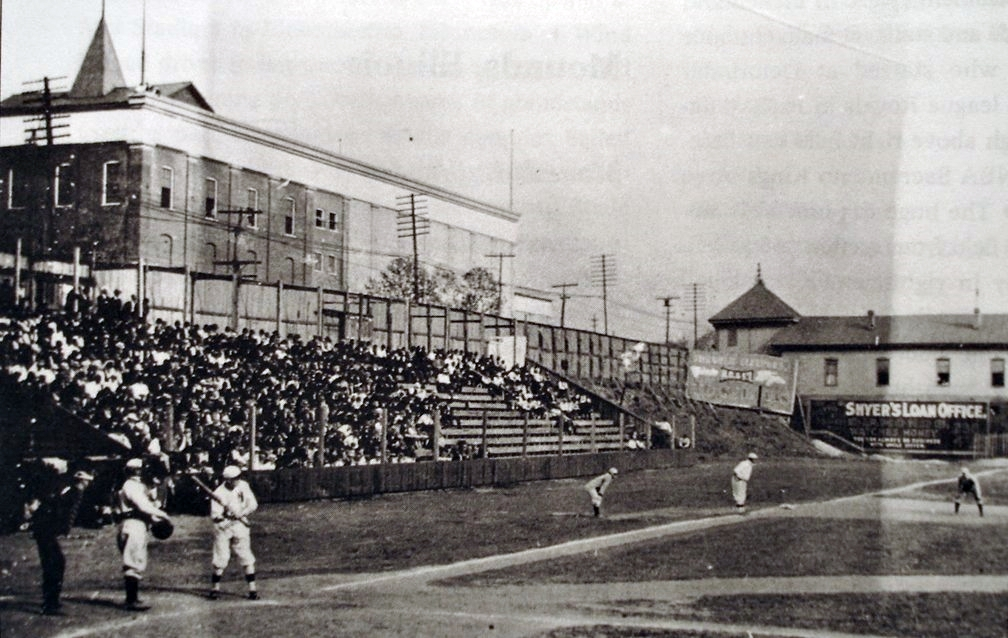
Sulphur Dell in its first configuration

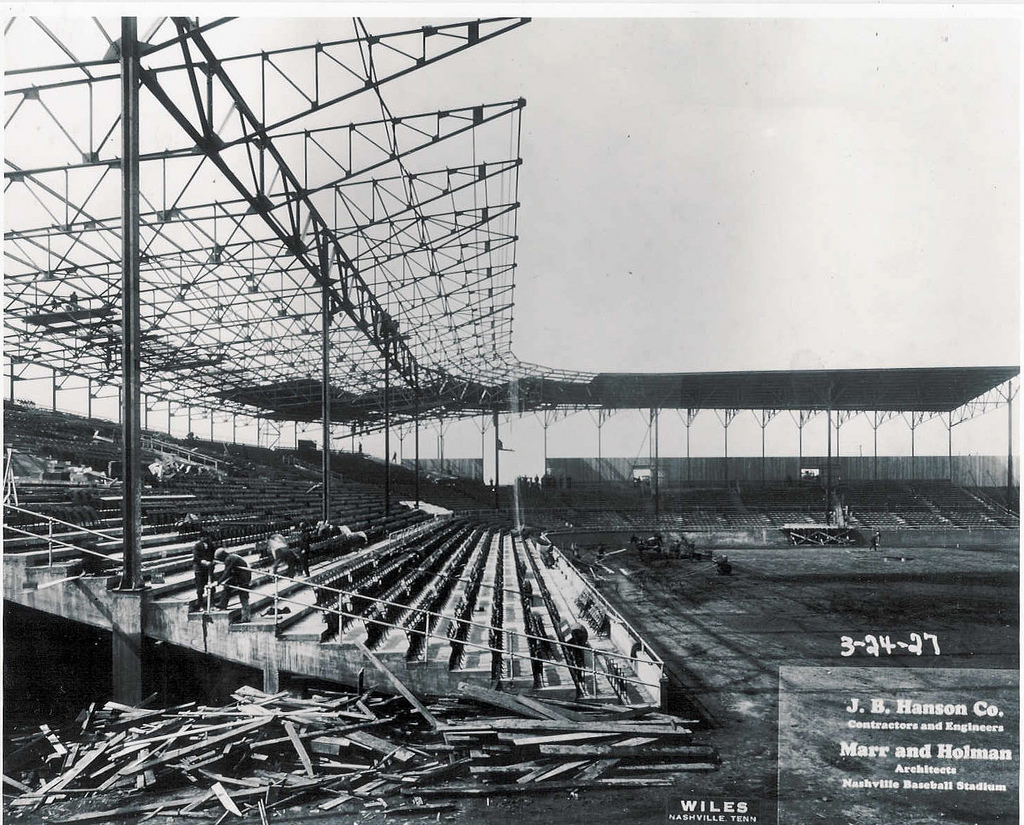
The grandstand being rebuilt in 1927

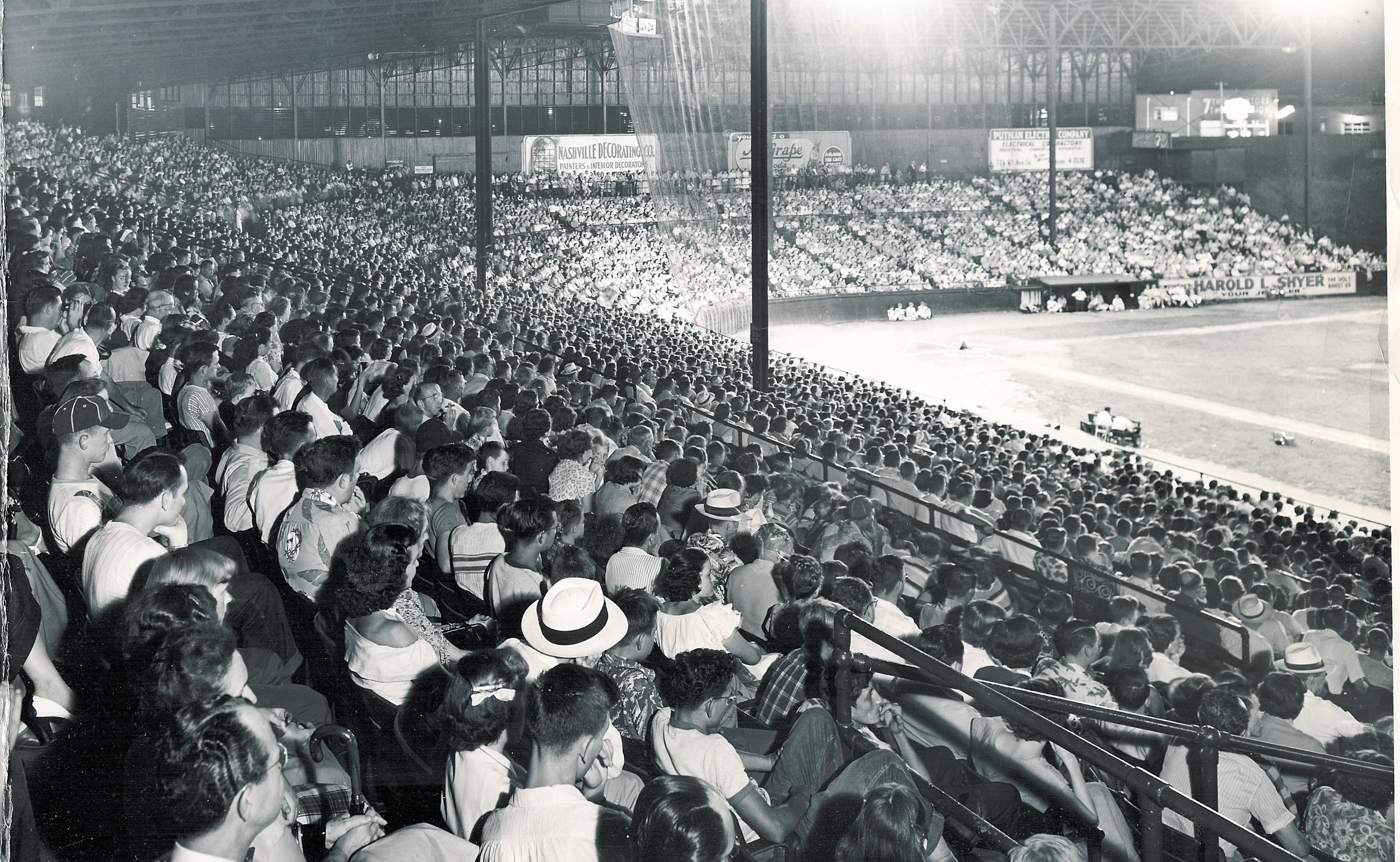
A packed grandstand in the 1950s

- Previously:

Sulphur Spring Park (c. 1850s–1860s)
Athletic Park (1870–1907)

- Home of:

Nashville Americans – Southern League (1885–1886)
Nashville Blues – Southern League (1887)
Nashville Tigers – Southern League (1893–1894)
Nashville Seraphs – Southern League (1895)
Nashville Centennials – Central League (1897)
Nashville Vols – Southern Association (1901–1961) / South Atlantic League (1963)
Nashville Standard Giants/Elite Giants – independent (1920–1928)
Nashville Stars – Negro Major League (1942)
Nashville Black Vols/Cubs – Negro Southern League (1945–1951)

- Location: The block bounded by present-day Jackson Street, Fourth Avenue North, Harrison Street, and Fifth Avenue North, just north of the Tennessee State Capitol; 900 Fifth Avenue North (36.173142°N 86.785386°W)
- Orientation:

Home plate in northeast corner of block facing southwest (1884–1926)
Home plate in southwest corner of block facing northeast (1927–1963)

- Opened: c. 1850s; grandstand erected in 1885
- Closed: 1963
- Demolished: 1969

Sulphur Spring Park, as Sulphur Dell was first known, was located in a bottomland, or dell, which was used by early settlers for trading and watering at a natural sulphur spring. In the 1850s, a portion of the land was re-purposed for baseball. By 1870, the baseball grounds were referred to as "Athletic Park". In 1885, a wooden grandstand was built at the corner of modern-day Fourth Avenue North and Jackson Street to accommodate fans of the Nashville Americans, who were charter members of the original Southern League. Several other minor league teams followed the Americans, but the ballpark's longest tenant was the Southern Association's Nashville Vols, who played there from 1901 to 1963. Sportswriter Grantland Rice started referring to the ballpark as "Sulphur Spring Dell" in 1908, which he later shortened to "Sulphur Dell".

The original grandstand was situated with home plate facing the southwest toward the Tennessee State Capitol building. Consequently, batters would often have to compete with the afternoon sunlight shining in their eyes. After the 1926 season, the entire ballpark was demolished and rebuilt as a concrete-and-steel structure with home plate in the southwest corner facing northeast along Fourth Avenue North. Sulphur Dell's infamous outfield was born out of this realignment. The second configuration included a significant "terrace" or sloping outfield: a steep incline that ran along the entire outfield wall, most dramatically in right and center fields.

In its prime, Sulphur Dell was nestled in an area that was home to the city's garbage dump, stockyards, and various warehouses. The Vols left after the conclusion of the 1963 season. Amateur baseball teams played there in 1964, and it was converted to a speedway for three weeks in 1965. The stadium then served as a tow-in lot for Metro Nashville, before being demolished on April 16, 1969. Until 2014, it was the location of a number of parking lots used by state employees. In 2015, the city built First Tennessee Park on the site.

=== Greenwood Park ===
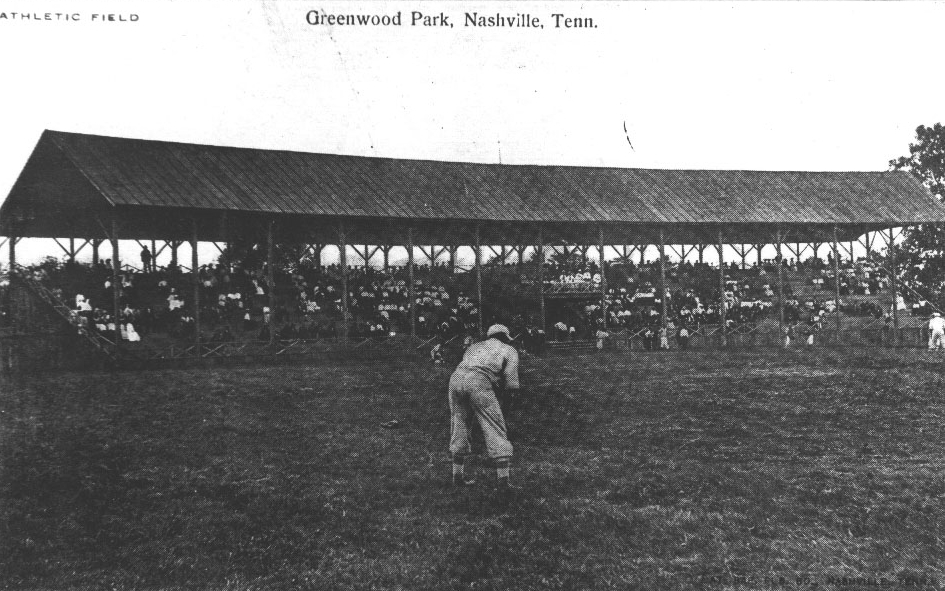
The Greenwood Park grandstand as viewed from the field

- Home of: Nashville Standard/Elite Giants independent (1920–1928)
- Location: The northeast corner of Spence Lane and Elm Hill Pike, across from Greenwood Cemetery (36.144067°N 86.722433°W)
- Opened: 1905
- Closed: 1949

Greenwood Park, established in 1905, was a public park for Nashville's black community. In addition to picnic space, amusement riders, and a swimming pool, the grounds were home to a baseball diamond used by the independent Nashville Standard/Elite Giants from 1920 to 1928 and other Negro league teams. The park was demolished after its 1949 closure.

=== Tom Wilson Park ===
- Home of: Nashville Elite Giants – independent (1929) / Negro National League (1930) / Negro Southern League (1932) / Negro National League (1933–1934)
- Location: Near the convergence of Second and Fourth Avenues, just north of the fairgrounds (Historical marker at 36.1453°N 86.7644°W)
- Opened: 1929
- Closed: 1946

Tom Wilson Park was located in what was at the time Nashville's largest black community, known as Trimble Bottom, near the convergence of Second and Forth Avenues, just north of the fairgrounds. It opened in 1929 to serve as the home park for owner Thomas T. Wilson's Nashville Elite Giants, a Negro league team which competed in several circuits from 1929 to 1930 and 1932 to 1934. The ballpark also served as a spring training site for other Negro league teams. Wilson discontinued all baseball activities at the park in 1946, and it was later demolished.

=== Herschel Greer Stadium ===
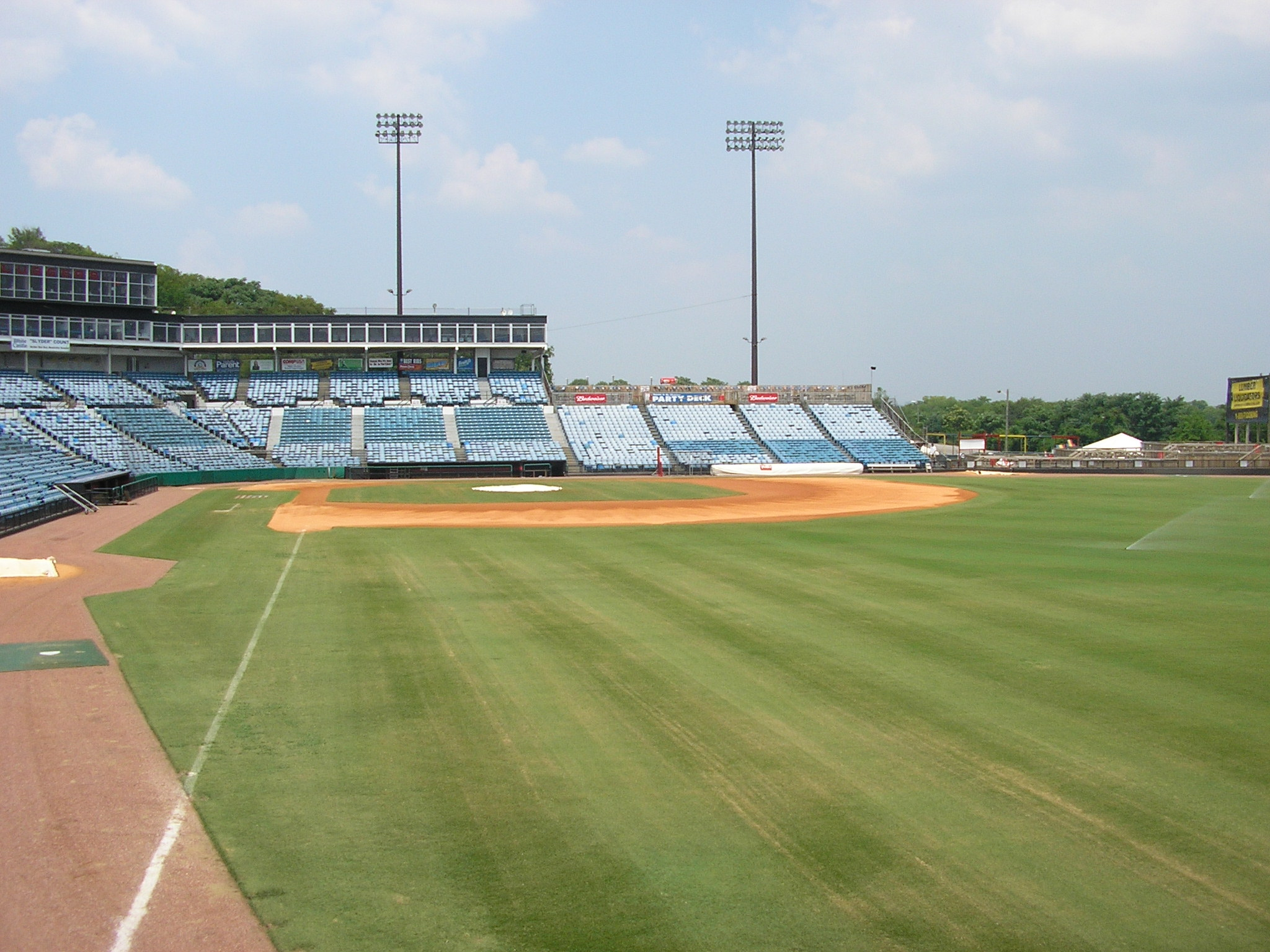
Greer Stadium's diamond and seating bowl as seen from right field

- Home of:

Nashville Sounds – Southern League (1978–1984) / American Association (1985–1997) / Pacific Coast League (1998–2014)
Nashville Xpress – Southern League (1993–1994)

- Location: The foot of St. Cloud Hill on the grounds of Fort Negley; 534 Chestnut Street (36.143142°N 86.773431°W)
- Orientation: Home plate faced southeast
- Opened: 1978
- Closed: 2014
- Demolished: 2019

Herschel Greer Stadium, located on the grounds of Fort Negley, an American Civil War fortification, was opened in 1978 for the Nashville Sounds, an expansion franchise of the Double-A Southern League who moved to the Triple-A American Association in 1985 and to the Triple-A Pacific Coast League in 1998. The facility closed at the end of the 2014 baseball season, after which the Sounds left for the new First Tennessee Park. Greer remained deserted for over four years until its demolition in 2019.

Amidst the Sounds' 37-season run, Greer simultaneously hosted two professional baseball clubs in 1993 and 1994, acting as a temporary home to a displaced Southern League franchise known during that period as the Nashville Xpress. They were named for the railroad tracks located just beyond the right-center field wall to the stadium's east-southeast. Greer was best recognized by its distinctive guitar-shaped scoreboard, which measured 115.6 feet (35.2 m) across, 53 feet (16 m) high, and 2 feet (0.61 m) deep.

=== First Horizon Park ===
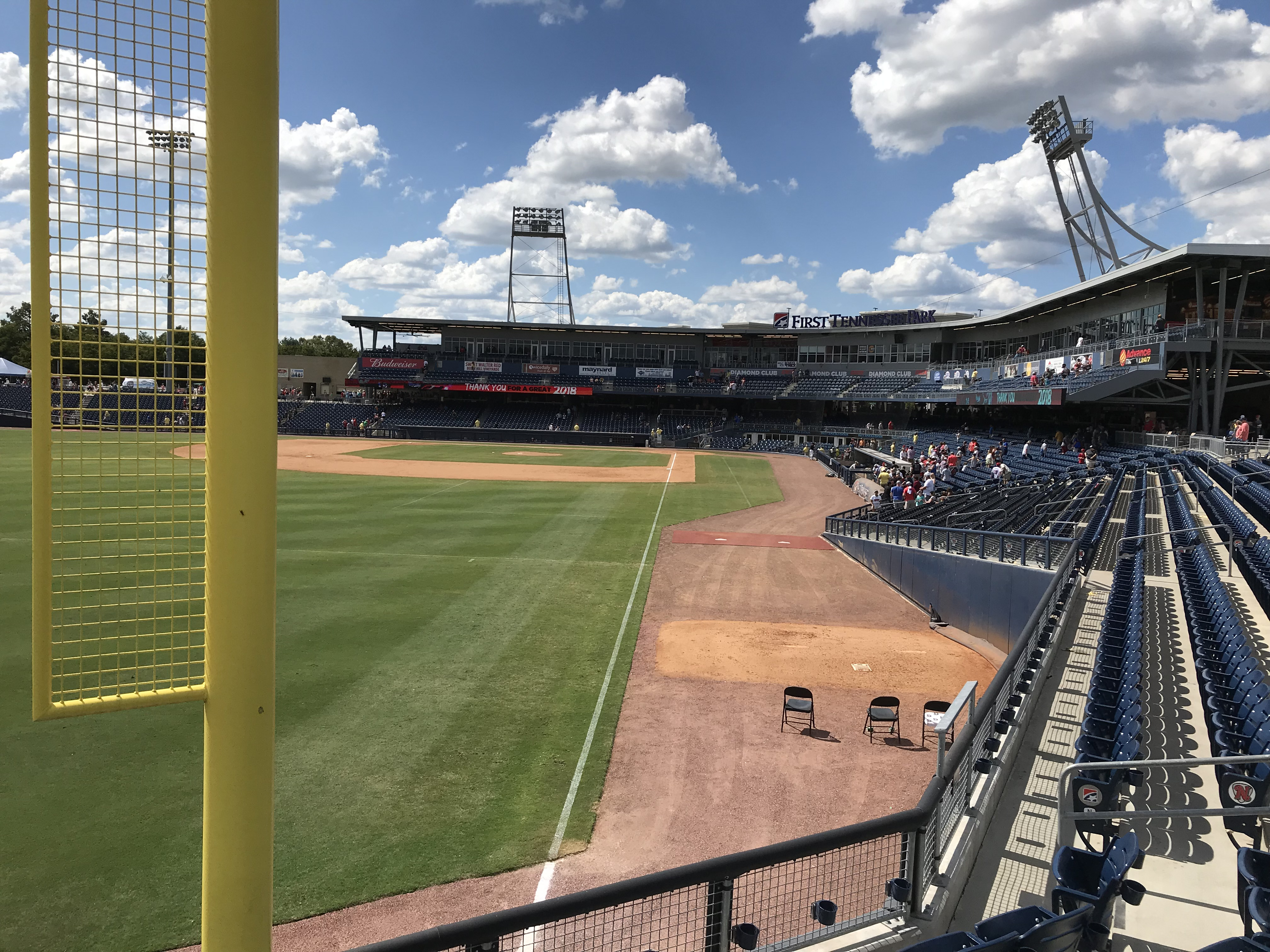
First Horizon Park as viewed from left field by the foul pole and home bullpen

- Previously:

First Tennessee Park (2015–2019)

- Home of: Nashville Sounds – Pacific Coast League (2015–2020) / Triple-A East (2021) / International League (2022–present)
- Location: Between Third and Fifth Avenues downtown, just north of the Tennessee State Capitol; 19 Junior Gilliam Way (36.173031°N 86.785033°W)
- Orientation: Home plate faces southeast
- Opened: 2015

First Horizon Park, located downtown on the site of the former Sulphur Dell, is the second ballpark used by the Nashville Sounds, who relocated from Greer Stadium in 2015. The $91 million stadium has a fixed seating capacity of 8,500 people, but can accommodate up to 10,000 with additional grass berm seating. One of First Horizon Park's most recognizable features, like Greer Stadium before it, is a 142 by 55 foot (43 by 17 m) guitar-shaped scoreboard beyond the right-center field wall.

== See also ==
- History of professional baseball in Nashville, Tennessee
- Lists of baseball parks
