= DeFord Bailey =

American country musician (1899–1982)

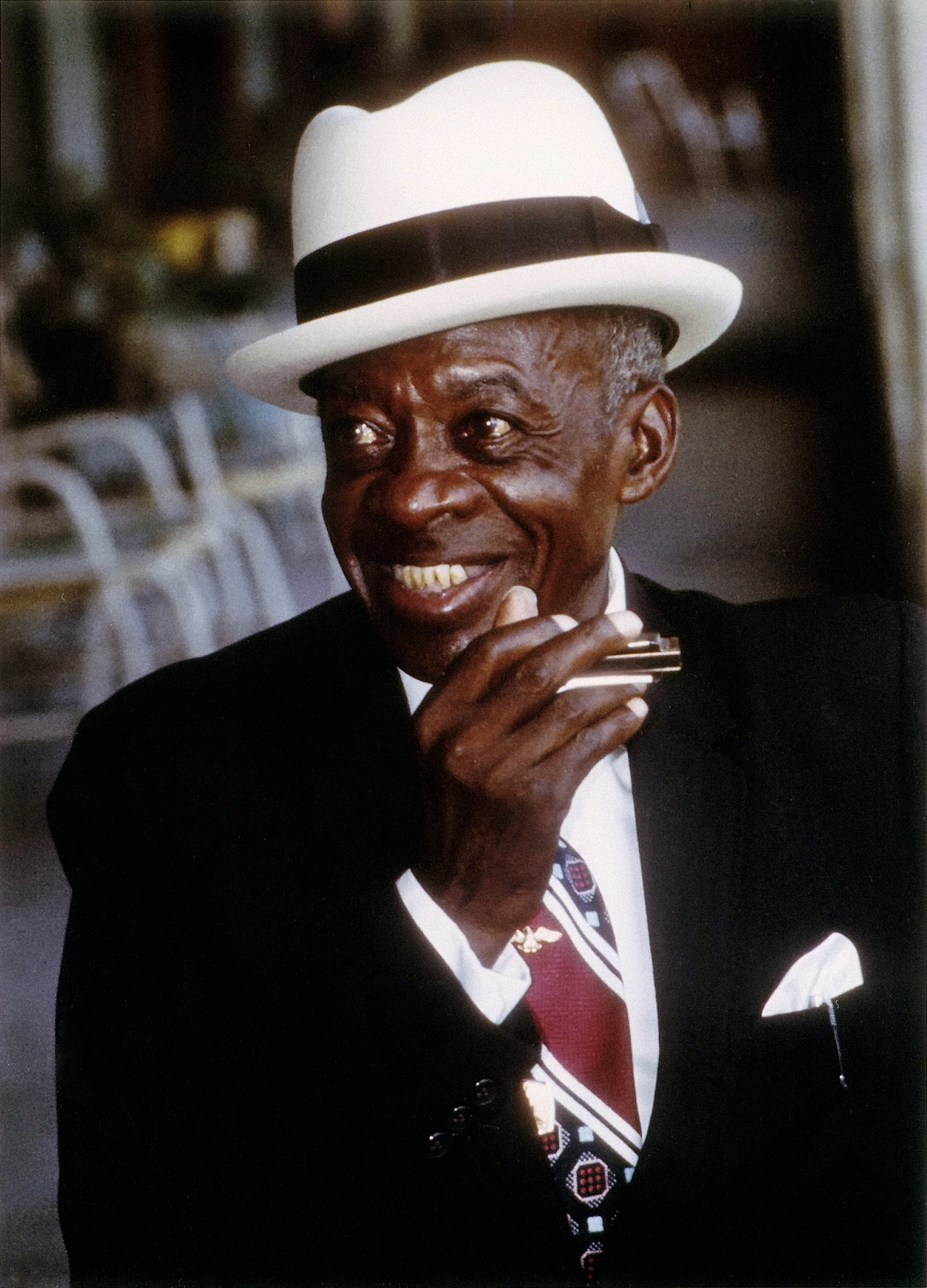
- Bailey in the 1970s

Background information
- Born: December 14, 1899; Smith County, Tennessee, U.S.
- Died: July 2, 1982 (aged 82) Nashville, Tennessee, U.S.
- Genres: Country; blues
- Occupation: Musician
- Instruments: Harmonica; guitar; banjo
- Years active: 1920s–1941
- Labels: Victor; Bluebird; RCA

DeFord Bailey (December 14, 1899 – July 2, 1982) was an American old-time musician and songwriter considered to be the first African American country music star. He started his career in the 1920s and was one of the first performers to be introduced on Nashville radio station WSM's Grand Ole Opry, and becoming, alongside Uncle Dave Macon, one of the program's most famous performers. He was the first African-American performer to appear on the show, and the first performer to record his music in Nashville. Bailey played several instruments in his career but is best known for playing the harmonica, often being referred to as a "harmonica wizard".

Bailey was born and raised in Tennessee, all his family played "black hillbilly" country and blues music and he learned how to play the harmonica and mandolin while recuperating from polio as a young child. He moved from New York to Nashville with relatives in his late teens and was a significant early contributor to Nashville's burgeoning music industry. Among the first generation of entertainers to perform live on the radio, his recorded compositions were well-known and popular.

Bailey toured and performed with Roy Acuff and many well-known country artists during the 1930s. But as a result of the 1941 royalties disagreement between Broadcast Music, Inc. (BMI) and American Society of Composers, Authors and Publishers (ASCAP), he was fired by WSM and stopped making his living as an entertainer. Afterwards, he supported himself and his family by opening a shoe shining company and renting out rooms in his home. He returned to sporadic public performances in 1974 when he was invited to participate in the Opry's first Old-Timers show and in 2005 was posthumously inducted into the Country Music Hall of Fame.

== Early life ==
Deford Bailey was born on December 14, 1899, near the Bellwood community in Carthage, Smith County, Tennessee. At least one of his grandfathers had been enslaved. His family was musically inclined; a grandfather was a fiddler, his mother, who died when he was about a year old, played guitar, and a brother played banjo.

This musical environment played a significant role in Bailey’s early development. His paternal grandfather, Lewis Bailey, was a well-known harmonica player in the region and taught him to play the instrument, introducing him to tunes such as “Fox Chase” and “John Henry,” which later became part of his repertoire.

Bailey suffered from polio, then called infant paralysis, and was taken in by an aunt named Barbara Lou. He learned to play the harmonica and mandolin at the age of three when he contracted polio. While he was ill, Bailey was confined to bed for a year and could only move his head and arms. His style of playing the harmonica took root during that time, as he imitated the sounds of the natural world around him and of the trains traveling through the countryside. Though Bailey did recover from his bout with polio, there were some long-term consequences. His back remained slightly misshapen, and he only grew to be 4 feet, 10 inches. He was so short and slender as a teenager that he was mistaken to be an underage child by railroad ticket agents.

As a young musician, Bailey gained a local reputation for his harmonica playing and was frequently called upon to perform at family gatherings and other social events, experiences that helped shape his early performance style.

His foster father, Clark Odom, was hired as a manager for a farm near Nashville, and in 1908 the family made the move from Smith County. The Odoms and their foster son lived on Nashville and Franklin Tennessee farms Clark Odom managed for several years. In 1918, the family moved to Nashville when Clark Odom got a city job, and Bailey started to perform locally there as an amateur.

== Career ==
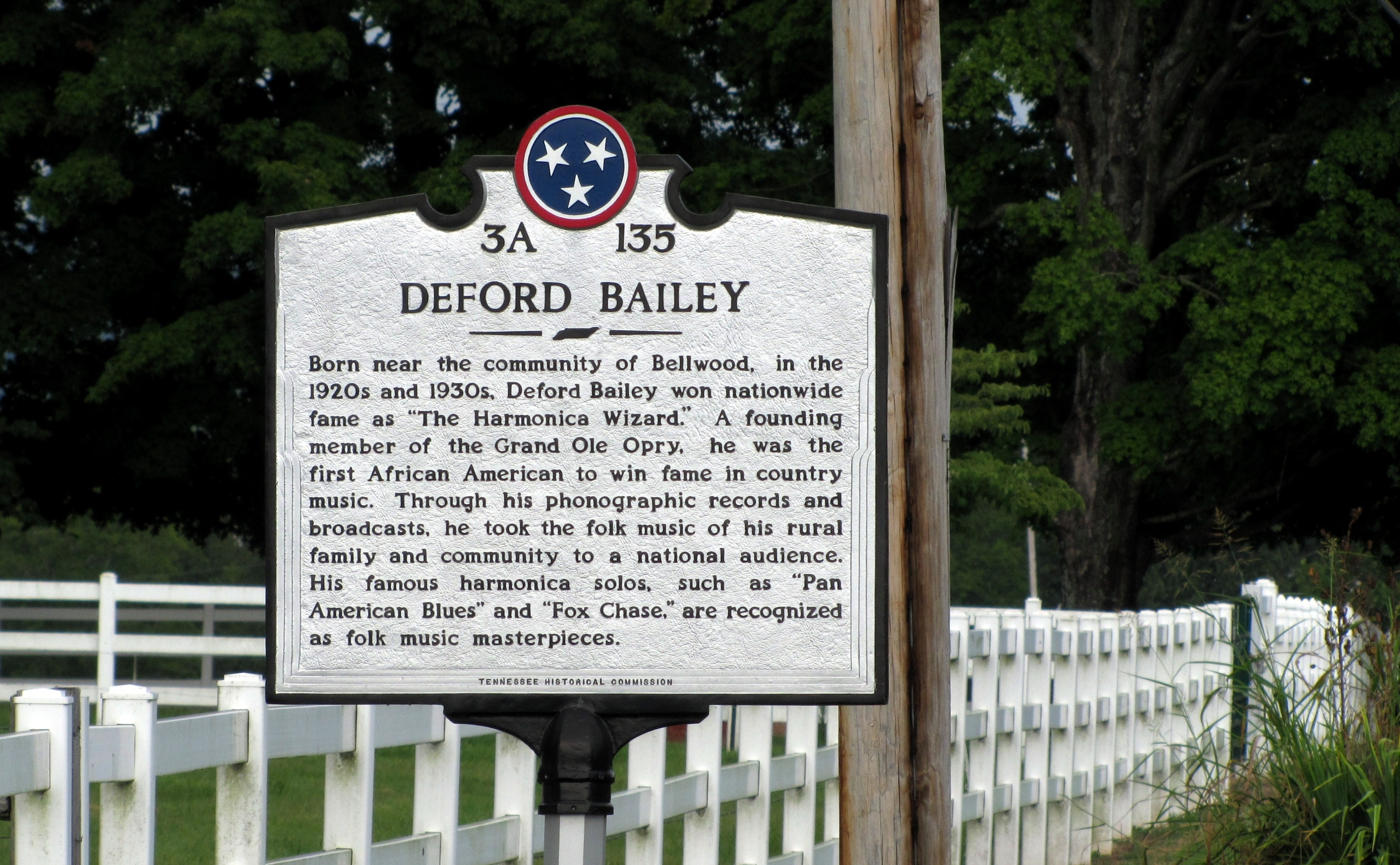
A Tennessee Historical Commission marker near Bailey's birthplace in Smith County

Bailey's first radio appearance was apparently in September 1925 on Fred Exum's WDAD, a Nashville station that only lasted from 1925 until sometime in 1927. His first documented appearances, however, were in 1926 according to The Nashville Tennessean including WDAD on January 14 and WSM on June 19. On December 10, 1927, he debuted his trademark song, "Pan American Blues" (named for the Louisville and Nashville Railroad's Pan-American), on a program then known as the WSM Barn Dance. At that time Barn Dance aired after NBC's classical music show, the Music Appreciation Hour. While introducing Bailey, WSM station manager and announcer George D. Hay exclaimed on-air, "For the past hour, we have been listening to music largely from Grand Opera, but from now on, we will present 'The Grand Ole Opry.'" "Pan American Blues" was the first recording of a harmonica blues solo.

Several records by Bailey were issued in 1927 and 1928, all of them harmonica solos. In 1927 he recorded for Brunswick Records in New York City, In 1928 he made the first recordings in Nashville, eight sides for RCA Victor, three of which were issued on the Victor, Bluebird, and RCA labels. Emblematic of the ambiguity of Bailey's position as a recording artist is the fact that his arguably greatest recording, "John Henry", was released by RCA separately in both its "race" series and its "hillbilly" series. In addition to his well-known harmonica, Bailey also played the guitar, bones, and banjo.

Bailey was a pioneer member of the WSM Grand Ole Opry and one of its most popular performers, appearing on the program from 1927 to 1941. During this period he toured with major country stars, including Uncle Dave Macon, Bill Monroe, and Roy Acuff. Acuff later said "I was an unknown when I began touring with DeFord. He could draw a crowd, not me. He helped me get started." Bailey's own article at the Country Music Hall of Fame called him "one of the Grand Ole Opry's most popular early performers and country music's first African American star." Like other Black stars of his day traveling in the Southern United States and Western United States, he faced difficulties in finding food and accommodations while on tour because of discriminatory Jim Crow laws. Sales were slow at first, so Bailey was put on a $5 fixed fee. This gave him a steady income but eventually left him short compared to his tour mates as the takings grew. His tour mates were split on the matter. Some would bring him food to his car or sneak him into hotels through the fire escape, and even refuse to stay at or eat at establishments that refused him.

Bailey was fired by WSM in 1941 because of a licensing conflict between BMI and ASCAP, which prevented him from playing his best-known tunes on the radio. When he was let go from the Opry, that effectively ended his performance and recording career. Bailey then spent the rest of his life running his own shoeshine stand and renting out rooms in his home to make a living. Though he continued to play the harmonica, he rarely performed publicly. One of his rare performances occurred in 1974, when he agreed to appear on the Opry. This was a special event to mark the Opry leaving the Ryman Auditorium for the Grand Ole Opry House. This performance became the impetus for the Opry's annual Old Timers' Shows.

Afterwards, Bailey continued to perform at the Opry only occasionally. He played there on his 75th birthday in December 1974, at the Old Timers Shows, and also in April 1982. A few months later that year, in June, he was taken to Nashville's Baptist Hospital in failing health. Bailey died from kidney and heart failure on July 2, 1982, at his daughter's home in Nashville, and is buried in Greenwood Cemetery there.

== Musical style and technique ==
Bailey was known for his distinctive harmonica technique, which combined elements of melody, rhythm, and sound imitation. His playing often reproduced sounds from the natural and mechanical world, including animals and trains, demonstrating a high level of creativity and control over the instrument.Unlike many performers of his time, Bailey used the harmonica as a lead instrument rather than simply for accompaniment, helping to expand its role in early country music. His performances reflected influences from African American blues traditions, and his style has been cited as an example of the close relationship between blues and the development of country music.

== Family ==
Bailey’s family was deeply involved in music across multiple generations. His son, DeFord Bailey Jr., was a longtime rhythm and blues musician in Nashville and appeared regularly on the nationally syndicated television program Night Train in the 1960s. His band during this period included a guitarist who later became known as Jimi Hendrix, whose playing was reportedly influenced by Bailey Jr. Bailey Jr. continued performing in Nashville venues and regionally for decades and later worked as a musician at the Opryland USA theme park.

Bailey’s grandson, Carlos DeFord Bailey, is also a musician, whose talents were strong on the harmonica, and has performed at the Grand Ole Opry, continuing the family’s musical legacy into the 21st century.

More broadly, Bailey came from a musical family background: relatives played instruments such as fiddle, guitar, and banjo, contributing to his early development as a musician.

== Influence and posthumous accolades ==
Bailey himself said that he came from a tradition of "black hillbilly music". His family members had played a variety of instruments, including a grandfather who had been a well-known local fiddler in Smith County, Tennessee. He said later when referring to playing the harmonica when he was growing up "Oh, I wore it out trying to imitate everything I hear! Hens, foxes, hounds, turkeys, and all those trains and things on the road. Everything around me."

Along with performing well-known genre classics such as "Cow-Cow Blues", Bailey also wrote his own signature Opry songs, like the train-imitating "Pan American Blues" and the "Dixie Flyer Blues". When WSM's power increased to 50,000 watts, Bailey's influence also increased, with harmonica enthusiasts listening to his performances and studying his recordings.

2005 Nashville Public Television produced the documentary DeFord Bailey: A Legend Lost. The documentary was broadcast nationally through PBS and directed by Kathy Conkwright. The documentary featured interviews with Bailey's 3 children, as well as others who worked closely with him. Not only did it explore his life and career, but also the broader influence he had on black musicians in country music. It was later re-aired in 2019 in conjunction with Ken Burns' PBS documentary series Country Music. Bailey was inducted into the Country Music Hall of Fame on November 15, 2005. The DeFord Bailey Tribute Garden at the George Washington Carver Food Park in Nashville was dedicated on June 27, 2007. The Encyclopedia of Country Music called him "the most significant black country star before World War II." Bailey is still being referred to as a "harmonica wizard" more than three decades after his death.

In 2022, the Grand Ole Opry formally apologized to Bailey, acknowledging past injustices against him, as well as the role it played in "suppressing the contributions of our diverse community". In the same year, his grandson Carlos Deford Bailey made his debut for The Grand Ole Opry. Deford Bailey's picture was directly behind his grandson when he walked on the stage.

In May 2023, a street in Nashville’s Edgehill neighborhood was officially renamed DeFord Bailey Avenue in his honor. The designation replaced Horton Avenue and was marked by a public dedication ceremony on May 20 attended by family members and community leaders. The location holds particular significance, as Bailey lived in the Edgehill neighborhood for nearly 60 years and operated a shoeshine business nearby following the end of his music career. His grandson, Carlos DeFord Bailey, played a key role in advocating for recognition of his grandfather’s legacy, including efforts leading up to the street renaming. The honor reflects Bailey’s status as an early star of the Grand Ole Opry and one of its first Black performers, whose contributions to country music were not widely recognized during his lifetime.

In addition to his popularity during his lifetime, Bailey has come to be recognized as a foundational figure in the development of country music. As en early African American performer on the Grand Ole Opry, Bailey built his career despite facing racial opposition and segregation. Scholars have pointed to Bailey's work as evidence of the close relationship between African American blues traditions and early country music. Although his contributions were not fully acknowledged during much of his life, he was later recognized by the country music industry for his contributions.

== Discography ==
=== 78 rpm singles ===
Listing sourced from the University of Santa Barbara Library/American Discography Project's Discography of American Historical Recordings

- "Evening Prayer Blues" / "Alcoholic Blues" (Brunswick, 1927)
- "Muscle Shoal Blues" / "Up Country Blues" (Brunswick, 1927)
- "Dixie Flyer Blues" / "Pan American Blues" (Brunswick, 1927)
- "Fox Chase" / "Old Hen Cackle" (Vocalion, 1928)
- "Ice Water Blues" / "Davidson County Blues" (Victor, 1929)
- "John Henry" / "Like I Want To Be" (split single with Noah Lewis Jug Band) (Victor 23336, 1932)
- "John Henry" / "Chester Blues" (split single with D. H. Bilbro) (Victor 23831, 1933)

=== Albums ===
- The Legendary DeFord Bailey (Tennessee Folklore Society, 1998) (recorded 1974–1976)
