= Greenwood Park (Tennessee) =

Park in Nashville, Tennessee, United States

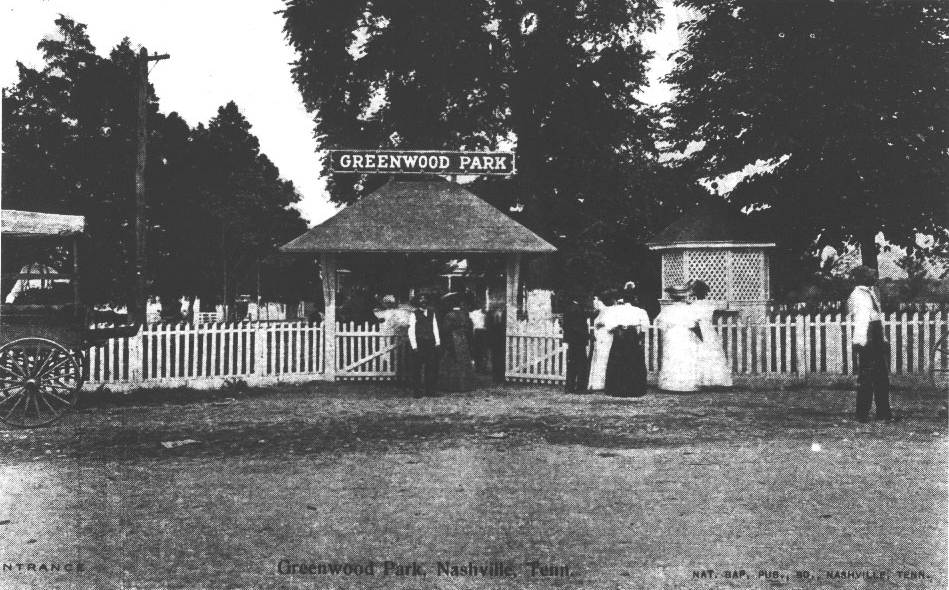
- The park entrance
- Interactive map of Greenwood Park
- Type: Urban park
- Location: Nashville, Tennessee
- Coordinates: 36.144067°N 86.722433°W
- Area: 40-acre (0.16 km^{2})
- Closed: 1949; 77 years ago

Greenwood Park was the first urban park and recreation area established for African Americans in Nashville, Tennessee. It was located on a 40-acre (16 ha) plot approximately 3 miles (4.8 km) east-southeast of downtown along Spence Lane between Lebanon Pike and Elm Hill Pike, across from Greenwood Cemetery. The park was founded in 1905 by Preston Taylor, a wealthy minister and former slave. It remained open until 1949.

Natural features of the grounds included hills, dales, evergreen trees, and streams. The park, which was lit by electric lights, also had a restaurant, theater, roller rink, roller coaster, shooting gallery, merry-go-round, zoo, swimming pool, and a baseball diamond. The ballpark's grandstand had seating for a few thousand people and hosted the games of the independent minor league Nashville Standard/Elite Giants and local amateur Negro league teams.

It was the home of a large annual fair hosted by the Tennessee Colored Fair Association. The 1909 fair was to include oration by Booker T. Washington and music by the Fisk Jubilee Singers.

The park was served by electric streetcars and was at the end of the Fairfield Street trolley line.

== See also ==
- List of baseball parks in Nashville
