= Georgia Gordon Taylor =

American singer

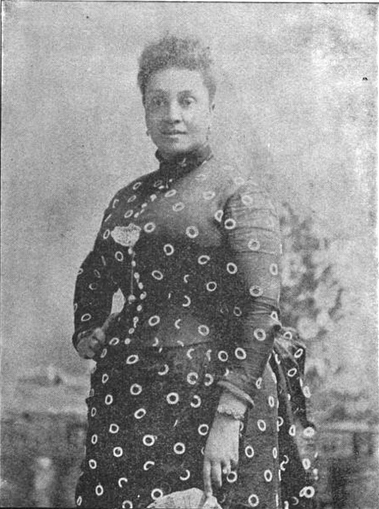
Georgia Gordon Taylor

Georgia Gordon Taylor (née Georgia Gordon; 1855 - June 7, 1913) was an American soprano from the U.S. state of Tennessee. She was the leader of the "Original Fisk Jubilee Singers".

== Biography ==
Georgia Gordon was born in Nashville, Tennessee in 1855. Her mother, Mercy Duke Gordon (1833-1890), was mulatto, and her father, George Gordon (1830-1870), was a slave. She had a half-sister, Elwin (born 1848). Taylor's cousin, Adelaide Allen, was the mother of Howard University professor Sterling Allen Brown.

"Swing Low, Sweet Chariot"
"Swing Low, Sweet Chariot" performed by the Fisk Jubilee Singers

In her youth, Taylor did not receive an education, but learned to read by studying the Bible. She arrived at Fisk University in 1868, studying literature under Helen Clarissa Morgan, and music with George L. White. In 1872, she became a Jubilee Singer, being one of the early singers who toured the US and Europe in 1872-73, with an appearance before Queen Victoria when they were in England. For seven successive years of almost continuous labor, she was the group's leader, traveling extensively in the interest of Fisk University, giving popular entertainments of a species of singing which originated among the slaves of the South. She possessed a soprano voice of rare quality that was pleasing and in demand.

After retiring from public life, she married Preston Taylor, founder of Greenwood Cemetery and minister of the Lee Avenue Christian Disciples of Christ Church at Nashville. She did church work alongside him. Their only child, Preston G. Taylor (1890–91) died age seven months.

Taylor died in 1913 in Nashville, and was buried in Greenwood Cemetery, a plaque commemorating that she was an original Fisk Jubilee Singer. She was posthumously awarded a bachelor's degree by Fisk University in 1978.
