= Preston Taylor =

American businessman, minister (1849–1931)

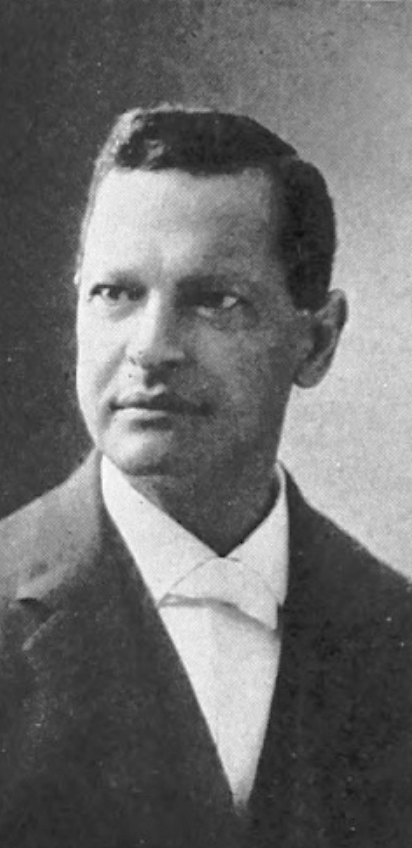
- Taylor from 1907
- Born: November 7, 1849; Shreveport, Louisiana, US
- Died: April 13, 1931 (age 81); Nashville, Tennessee, US
- Resting place: Greenwood Cemetery; 36.144719°N 86.724173°W
- Occupations: businessman minister philanthropist
- Notable work: Foundation of Greenwood Cemetery and Greenwood Park
- Spouse(s): Georgia Gordon; Ida D. Mallory

Religious life
- Religion: Christian Church

Preston Taylor (November 7, 1849 – April 13, 1931) was an African-American businessman, minister and philanthropist. In the early 20th century he was considered one of the most influential leaders of Nashville, Tennessee's black community. He created Greenwood Cemetery, which is the second oldest African-American cemetery in Nashville, and Greenwood Park, which was the first park for African-American communities in Nashville. A later public housing project was named in his honor.

== Biography ==
=== Early life ===
Taylor was born into slavery in Shreveport, Louisiana, on November 7, 1849, to enslaved parents, Zed and Betty Taylor. He was said to tell his mother that he wanted to be a preacher at the age of four after attending a sermon in Lexington, Kentucky. In 1864, during the American Civil War he enlisted in Company G of the 116th Regiment Infantry U.S. Colored Troops as a drummer and was at the Siege of Petersburg, fall of Richmond, and surrender of Lee. After the end of the war in 1865, his regiment did garrison duty in Texas and New Orleans where he was mustered out a free man. After the war he became a marble engraver and moved to Louisville, Kentucky. Whites in Kentucky refused to work with him, and he instead found work as a train porter for the Louisville & Chattanooga Railroad where he worked for four years.

=== Mt. Sterling ===
After resigning from the railroad, Taylor traveled throughout the North. When he returned to Kentucky, he was called to become a pastor. He became a minister with the Christian Church (Disciples of Christ) and settled in Mt. Sterling, Kentucky, about 1870. In 1874 he founded the High Street Christian Church, "the finest brick building as a place for the worship of God in the state", which became "the largest congregation in the state among those of his faith". He became known as the leading minister of his church during that time and was instrumental in organizing and building numerous congregations and meeting houses.

Taylor's work led to the creation of state and national denominational organizations for black churches. In 1872, Taylor organized the Kentucky Christian Missionary Convention and the national black Disciples organization

He was a strong advocate for the education of blacks and in the mid-1880s he purchased college property at New Castle, Kentucky, and created the Christian Bible College at New Castle, of which he was later a trustee and financial agent. He was also unanimously chosen the general evangelist of the U.S. He also edited a section of the denominational journal, the Christian Standard called "Our Colored Brethren".

Even though blacks were largely excluded from Reconstruction Era business opportunities, he was able to get a contract to build sections of railroad track from Mt. Sterling to Richmond. The contractors initially refused to hire black workers, preferring Irish laborers. This became the foundation of his successful business career. Taylor's success in the sections for which he was responsible so impressed railroad president, Collis Potter Huntington, that Huntington asked Taylor to advise other contractors but Taylor chose to remain at home so that he could continue his preaching.

=== Nashville ===
In 1884, Taylor arrived in Nashville, Tennessee. He "soon emerged as one of the city's most influential African American business and religious leaders."

He married one of the original Fisk Jubilee Singers, Georgia Gordon Taylor (1855–1913), better known as Georgia Taylor. She was the daughter of George Gordon, who was a slave, and a mulatto mother, Mercy Duke Gordon. At the age of 18, Georgia was in the group of vocalists from Fisk University who toured Europe and the U. S. during 1872 and 1873. After her return from the tour she married Taylor. They had a son in 1891, who died as an infant. She continued singing until her death in 1913, and was Taylor's closest companion. After her death, Taylor married his second wife, Ida D. Mallory.

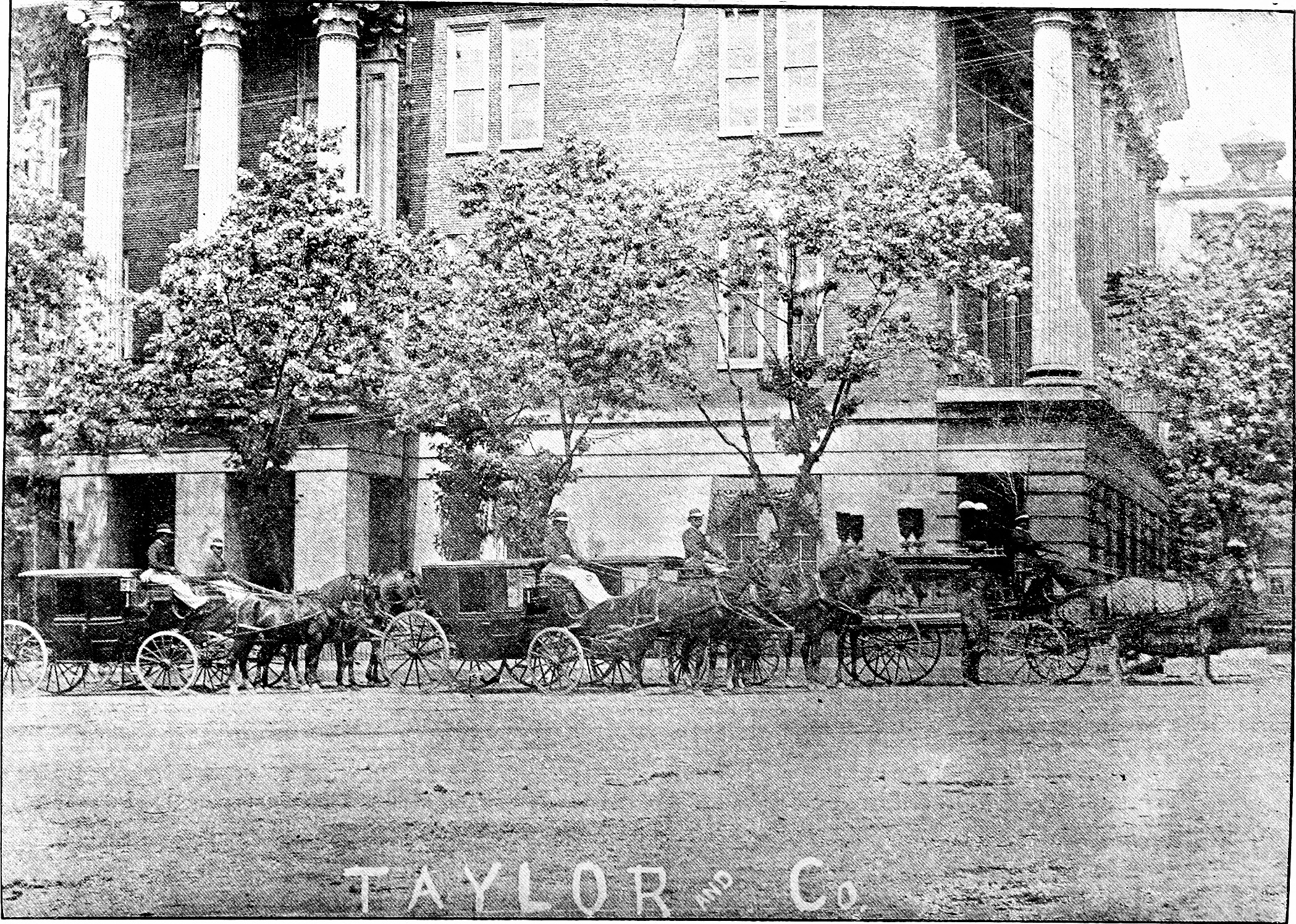
Taylor & Co. funeral procession for "Colored" firemenin Nashville

Taylor was appointed minister of Gay Street Christian Church, which was the "colored" congregation associated with the Vine Street First Christian Church. In 1891 he and a breakaway group left the Gay Street church and established a congregation in an office building on Spruce (Eighth) Street; in 1903 the congregation completed its own church building on Lea Avenue near Lafayette Street. Taylor was pastor of the church for 40 years, until his death in 1931. After Taylor's death the two congregations reunited to form Gay-Lea Christian Church, now called the New Covenant Christian Church and located on Osage Street.

In 1917 Taylor took the lead in creating the National Christian Missionary Convention, a nationwide organization of African American Disciples of Christ churches; he served as president of the Convention from its founding until his death.

Taylor was involved in multiple business ventures. He became a wealthy man through his business activities and was considered one of the most powerful and influential African-American businessmen in Nashville in the early years of the twentieth century. The first black bank, One Cent (Citizen's) Savings and Trust Company Banks, was organized with Taylor's help. In 1909 he was a prime mover in the foundation of Tennessee State Agricultural and Industrial State Normal College, a state-sponsored college for African Americans, which later became Tennessee State University.

In 1887 he purchased 37 acres (15 ha) of dairy land for $30,000 at Elm Hill Pike Road near Buttermilk Ridge. There he established Greenwood Cemetery in 1888, declaring it to be a low cost, first class cemetery for African-Americans. Greenwood Cemetery is the second oldest cemetery for blacks in Nashville. Concurrently he founded the Taylor Funeral Company, a mortuary, at 449 North Cherry Street (now Fourth Avenue, and not related to today's Taylor Funeral Home of Nashville.)

== Philanthropy ==
In 1905 he developed Greenwood Park, a recreational park for the African American communities, covering about 37.5 acres (15.2 ha) at Lebanon road near Spence Lane. It was the first park for Nashville's African American residents, who at the time were not allowed to utilize public parks. The park included gardens, fountains, a bandstand, and a baseball park. The annual "State Colored Fair" was held there. He even arranged for horse-drawn wagons to transport patrons from the streetcar to the park. The park remained open until 1949.

He bequeathed Greenwood Cemetery to the National Christian Missionary Convention of the Christian Church (Disciples of Christ), and it remains a nonprofit organization.

== Death ==
Until his death on April 13, 1931, Taylor was the best known African American citizen in Nashville. Taylor was buried in Greenwood Cemetery after a week-long interment ceremony.

== Recognition ==
Preston Taylor Housing, a public housing project in Nashville, was named in 1951 in his honor. It is located at 3900 Clifton Road and is now known as the Historic Preston Taylor Apartments. That part of Nashville also houses the Preston Taylor YMCA and Preston Taylor Ministries.
