= Sulphur Dell =

Former baseball park in Nashville, Tennessee, United States

- Suffer Hell
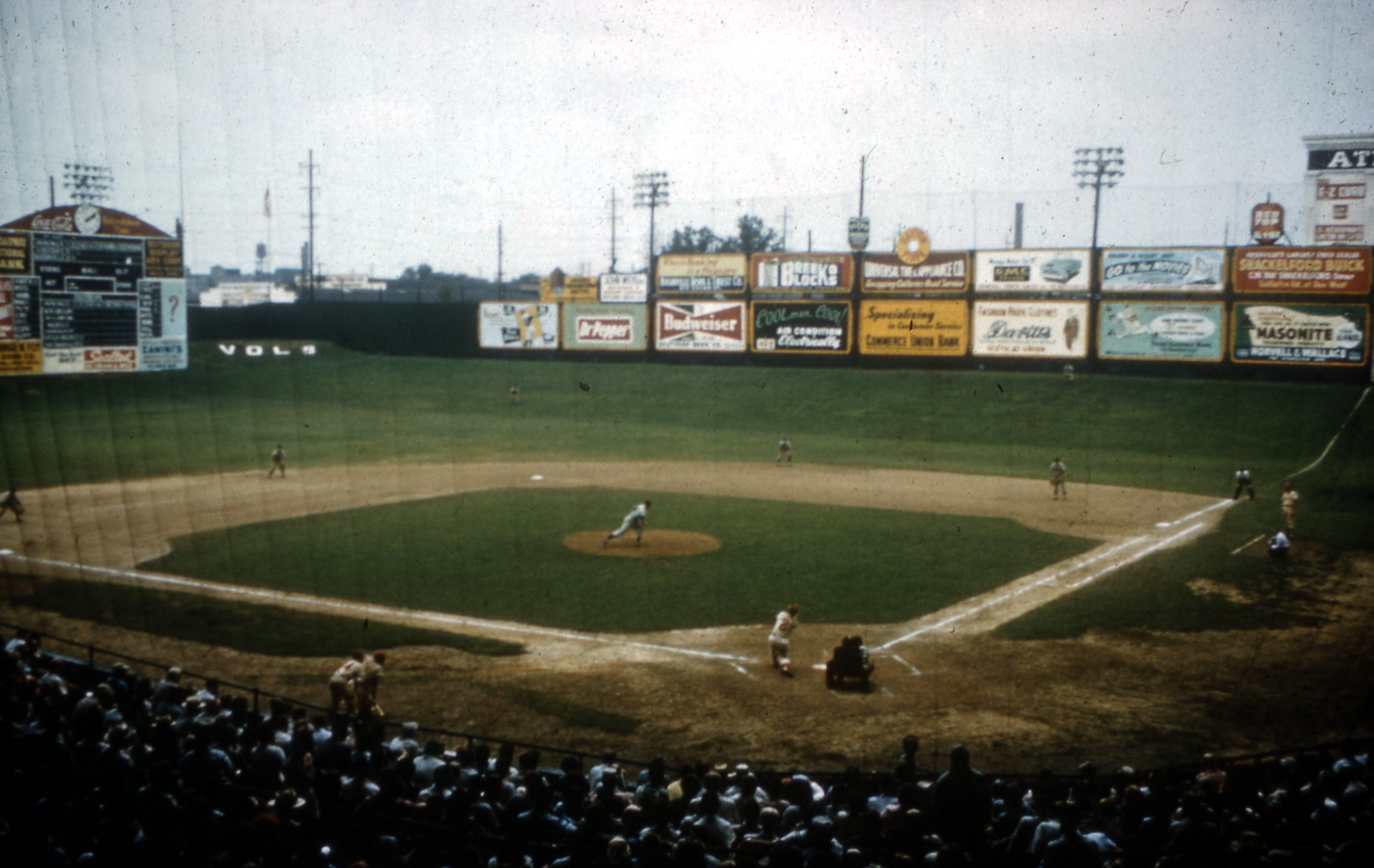
- Sulphur Dell, with its right field terrace
- Interactive map of Sulphur Dell
- Former names: Sulphur Spring Park (1885–1889); Athletic Park (1890–1907)
- Location: 900 Fifth Avenue North; Nashville, Tennessee; United States
- Coordinates: 36°10′22″N 86°47′08″W
- Capacity: 1,000 (1894); 2,500 (1901); 7,000 (1927); 8,000 (1932); 8,500 (1938)
- Surface: Grass
- Field size: 1885–1926: Left Field: 362 ft (110 m); Center Field: 485 ft (148 m); Right Field: 362 ft (110 m); 1927–1963: Left Field: 334 ft (102 m); Center Field: 421 ft (128 m); Right Field: 262 ft (80 m)

Construction
- Built: November 1884 – May 24, 1885
- Opened: March 30, 1885
- Renovated: 1893, 1894, 1897, 1908, 1927, 1951
- Expanded: 1893, 1894, 1897, 1920, 1938
- Closed: September 7, 1963 (last Vols game)
- Demolished: April 16, 1969
- Cost: $7,600 (1885) ($272,000 in 2025 dollars)
- Architects: William R. Gunn (1885); Marr and Holman (1927)
- General contractor: J. B. Hinson Co. (1927)

Tenants
- Nashville Americans (SOU) 1885–1886; Nashville Blues (SOU) 1887; Nashville Tigers (SOU) 1893–1894; Nashville Seraphs (SOU) 1895; Nashville Centennials (CL) 1897; Nashville Vols (SA/SAL) 1901–1961, 1963; Nashville Standard/Elite Giants (Indp.) 1920–1928; Nashville Stars (NML) 1942; Nashville Black Vols/Cubs (NSL) 1945–1951

Sulphur Dell, formerly known as Sulphur Spring Park and Athletic Park, was a baseball park in Nashville, Tennessee, United States. It was located just north of the Tennessee State Capitol building in the block bounded by modern-day Jackson Street, Fourth Avenue North, Harrison Street, and Fifth Avenue North. The ballpark was home to the city's minor league baseball teams from 1885 to 1963. The facility was demolished in 1969.

Amateur teams began playing baseball in the area known as Sulphur Spring Bottom as early as 1870 when it was a popular recreation area noted for its natural sulphur spring. A wooden grandstand was built in 1885 to accommodate patrons of the Nashville Americans, who were charter members of the original Southern League. Several other professional baseball teams followed the Americans, but the ballpark's longest tenant was the Southern Association's Nashville Vols, who played there from 1901 to 1963. Sportswriter Grantland Rice coined the Sulphur Dell moniker in 1908.

The stadium's original alignment, in which home plate faced southwest toward the Capitol, meant that batters would often have to compete with the afternoon sunlight shining in their eyes. Prior to the 1927 season, the ballpark was demolished and rebuilt as a concrete-and-steel structure on the southwestern side of the block with home plate facing northeast. The ballpark's best-known features were its short distance to the right field wall (262 ft (80 m)) and its significant terrace or sloping outfield: a steep incline that ran along the entire outfield wall, most dramatically in right and center fields.

In its prime, Sulphur Dell was nestled in an area that was home to the city's garbage dump, stockyards, and other various warehouses. The Vols folded after the conclusion of the 1963 season. Amateur baseball teams played there in 1964, and it was converted to a speedway for three weeks in 1965. The stadium then served as a tow-in lot for Metro Nashville, before being demolished on April 16, 1969. Until 2014, it was the location of a number of parking lots used by state employees. Since 2015, it has been the location of First Horizon Park, the home stadium of the Triple-A Nashville Sounds baseball team.

== History ==
=== Early history ===
Archaeologists believe the area was the site of a Native American settlement dating to the early Mississippian period (c. 1150 AD). It was likely the location of workshop where mineral water from an underground sulphur spring was boiled to collect salt. Early settlers knew the site as French Lick Springs, a bottomland, or dell, which they used for trading and watering. Also known as Sulphur Spring Bottom, this later became a popular area for picnicking and recreation. By the late 1830s, access to the springs had been restricted by entrepreneurs who enclosed the area and charged admission for access. People flocked to the springs for the touted medicinal benefits of bathing in and drinking from the waters. Baseball was first played at the site by amateur teams as early as 1870.

=== Sulphur Spring Park (1885–1889) ===
On October 6, 1884, the Nashville Americans were established as city's first professional baseball team. On November 7, club directors signed a five-year contract to lease the baseball grounds at Sulphur Spring Bottom on which they would build a ballpark. The land had hitherto been little more than solely a baseball field and required significant improvements to make it suitable for a professional team.

Construction on Sulphur Spring Park was scheduled to commence in late November 1884. A brick-and-cement dyke was built between Cherry and Summer Streets (Fourth and Fifth Avenue North) to hold back the spring water. The low land was filled in to bring it level with Cherry and Summer. The old bath houses were demolished and replaced with new ones that utilized a steam pump to draw up water. The grounds were graded, leveled, sowed with grass, and enclosed by a 15 ft (4.6 m) fence. In addition to the grandstand, a dancing hall and refreshment booths were also built. During construction, workers unearthed artifacts including bowls, shells, a flint chisel, and human skeletons believed to belong Native American Mound Builders.

A wooden 150 ft-long (46 m) grandstand was erected in the northeastern corner of the block bounded by modern-day Jackson Street, Fourth Avenue North, Harrison Street, and Fifth Avenue North. The main Jackson Street entrance led past the ticket booth and into the grandstand's reserved seats behind home plate and a screen backstop. Rooms for players, directors, scorers, and reporters were built under the grandstand. Restrooms and water fountains, which pumped up sulphur water from the springs below, were also built. The distance to the outfield fence was 362 ft (110 m) to left and right fields and 485 ft (148 m) to center. The total estimated cost of the project was US$7,600.

By late March 1885, construction was behind schedule, and additional men were brought in to expedite work in advance of the team's spring exhibition games. In the first such game held at the not-yet-completed ballpark, the Americans were defeated by the Indianapolis Hoosiers of the minor Western League, 8–4, on March 30. Nashville's first home win came on April 1 against the Cleveland Forest Cities of the same league, 15–7. On April 10, nearly 4,000 people were in attendance as the National League's Chicago White Stockings defeated the locals, 4–2. Work continued throughout the Americans' spring training slate and was not complete until May 24, over a month into the season.

As charter members of the Southern League, the Nashville Americans played their regular season home opener on May 4 against the Columbus Stars. In the top of the first, Nashville's Joe Werrick hit a two-RBI triple scoring James Hillery and John Cullen, but these were to be their only runs of the game. Tied 2–2 in the fifth, a bad throw allowed Columbus' Joe Strauss to score the winning run for the visitors. Alex Voss pitched well in the 3–2 Nashville loss, allowing only three runs on five hits and striking out four, but opposing pitcher Doc Landis held the Americans to just two runs on five hits. Errors, five by Nashville and four by Columbus, hampered both teams as none of the game's five runs were earned. The Americans won their first league home game three games later against the Birmingham Coal Barons, 12–5, on May 9. Hillery led Nashville's offence that day with a single, a double, two triples, and three runs scored. On May 30, Toad Ramsey of the visiting Chattanooga Lookouts pitched a no-hitter against Nashville in a game where only three locals reached base, two via walks and one on an error. The Americans played another season in 1886 and were followed by the Southern League's Nashville Blues in 1887.

The ballpark was built with hosting other sporting events in mind. A bicycling and running track measuring 150 yards (137 m) was constructed around the outfield. On Thanksgiving Day in 1885, Nashville's first organized football game was held at Athletic Park. The Nashville Football Club defeated the Nashville Athletic Club, 6–4.

Several improvements were made prior to the Americans' 1886 season. The first scoreboard was a blackboard on which scores were displayed by writing figures in chalk. It was replaced with a larger board using painted tin squares which hung on hooks. In September 1885, Summer Street (Fifth Avenue) was raised, which necessitated raising the adjacent fence to prevent onlookers. An additional row of boards was placed atop the Jackson Street fence, and a second fence was erected around the entire park inside the existing fence to further prevent unpaid viewing of games over or through the fence. The first base side of the grandstand was covered with a roof.

=== Athletic Park (1890–1907) ===
In 1890, the grounds became known as Athletic Park. The Southern League's Nashville Tigers played at the facility from 1893 to 1894. The grounds, though still utilized for amateur athletics, had not been used for professional sports since the Blues played there in 1887. In preparation for the Tigers' 1893 season, additional seating was added to the west (first base) side of the grandstand, and the fences were repaired. In early May, 200 chairs were placed in right field. A new press stand was erected later in the month. Extensive renovations were made prior to the 1894 season, including the construction of a new fence and grandstand just west of the original. The existing grandstand was refurbished and given a coat of whitewash, and a screen was placed to block the setting sun. This brought the total seating capacity to around 1,000, which consisted of about 500 opera chairs, some in private boxes near the front, and third base bleachers along Fourth Avenue. Additionally, the diamond was leveled, and a new scoreboard was added in right field.

On July 6, 1894, the Tigers and the New Orleans Pelicans played the first night game in Nashville. This was long before ballparks were equipped with electric lights, and night games were seen only as gimmicks. To put time into perspective, the first major league night game was not played until over 40 years later in 1935. Originally planned for an Independence Day doubleheader, the game was postponed by rain. An attempt to play on July 5 was also rained out, but the spectacle was finally rescheduled for July 6 as a tripleheader. The first two games would be played during the afternoon, with the special night game to be played that evening at 8:30 as an exhibition. The special program commenced with a fireworks display and was followed by a balancing act and slack-wire walking demonstration. Members of both teams competed in long-distance throwing and sliding competitions and a 100 yd (91 m) dash. Fifty-four large electric lights were placed around Athletic Park to illuminate the field, and the baseball was covered with phosphorus to aid visibility. Adding to the novelty of a night game, players marched onto the field wearing burlesque costumes that included ballet outfits, loud suits, dresses, wigs, and bonnets. The estimated 4,000 fans in attendance were entertained by antics such as base runners leading fielders on a chase through dark regions of the outfield and climbing up a light pole to avoid being tagged out. Nashville won, 3–2.

The city's Southern League entry in 1895 was called the Nashville Seraphs. They won the league pennant in their only season, becoming the city's first minor league baseball team to win a league championship.

By early 1897, Athletic Park had fallen into a state of dilapidation. Billy Work, manager of the Central League's Nashville Centennials, was desirous of building a new ballpark for the team, but eventually settled on making repairs to the existing facility. The old bleachers were replaced with seats, additional seating was added, and the fences were repaired. Poor attendance forced the Centennials to relocate to Henderson, Kentucky, on June 3.

In 1901, the newly formed Southern Association's Nashville Baseball Club, later named the Nashville Vols, began playing their home games at the ballpark. The seating capacity was expanded to 2,500, with 1,000 seats in the grandstand, before the Vols' first season. The semi-pro Negro league Nashville Elite Giants, a forerunner to the Nashville Standard/Elite Giants, started playing games at Athletic Park as early as 1907. The team remained at the park through 1928 when Tom Wilson Park was built for the team by their owner.

=== Sulphur Dell I (1908–1926) ===
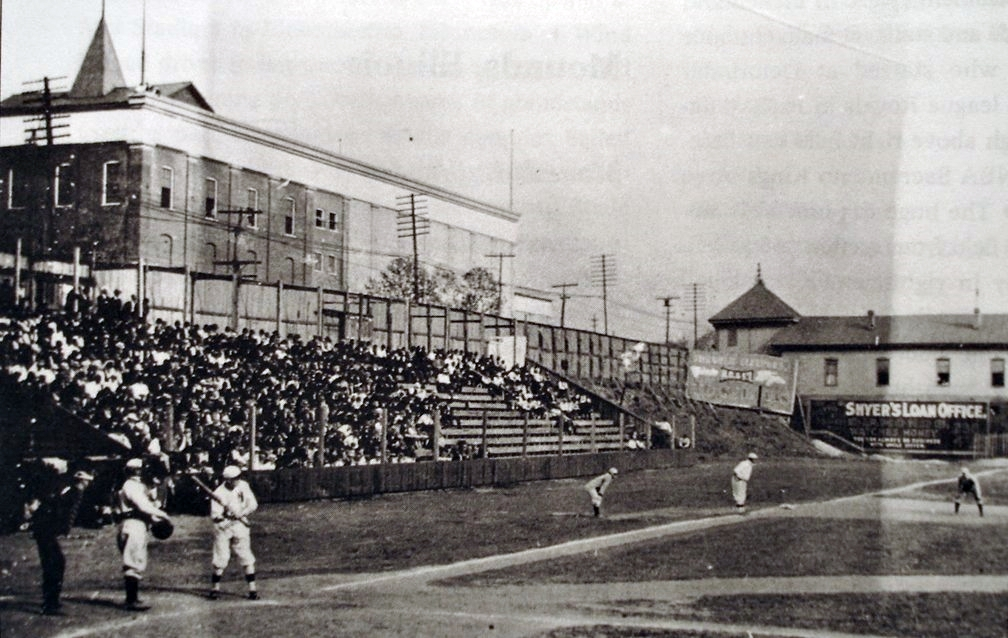
The Nashville Vols playing at Sulphur Dell in 1908

Nashville Tennessean sportswriter Grantland Rice started referring to the ballpark as Sulphur Spring Dell in 1908. A new grandstand was built that same year. He later shortened this name to Sulphur Dell, and the name stuck with the ballpark through its 1969 demolition and beyond. The last game of the 1908 season between the Vols and New Orleans Pelicans to decide the Southern Association championship was played at Sulphur Dell and dubbed by Rice "The Greatest Game Ever Played in Dixie".

In 1920, the grandstands were expanded further west on Jackson Street and further south on Fourth Avenue North.

=== Sulphur Dell II (1927–1963) ===
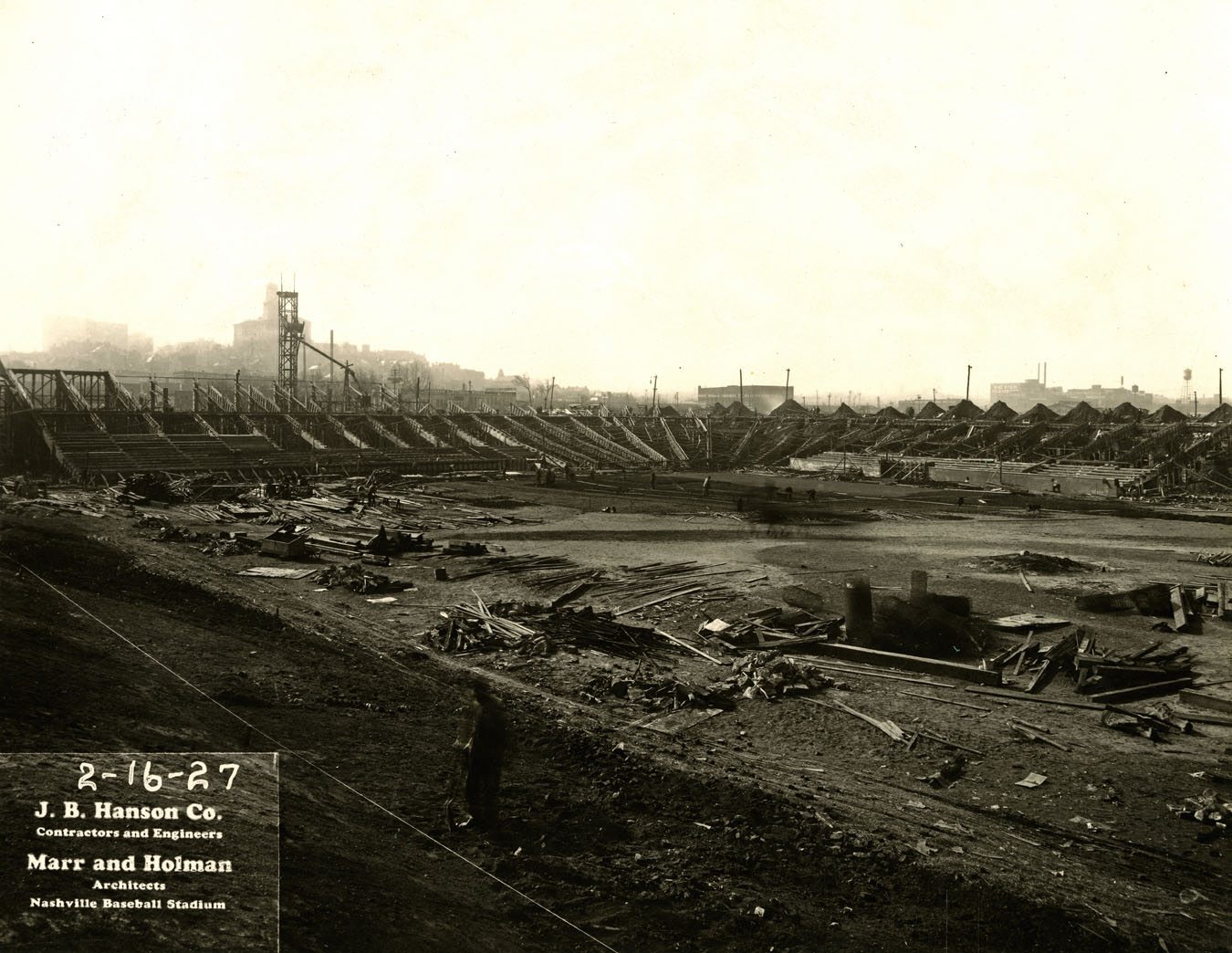
Construction of the new grandstand in 1927

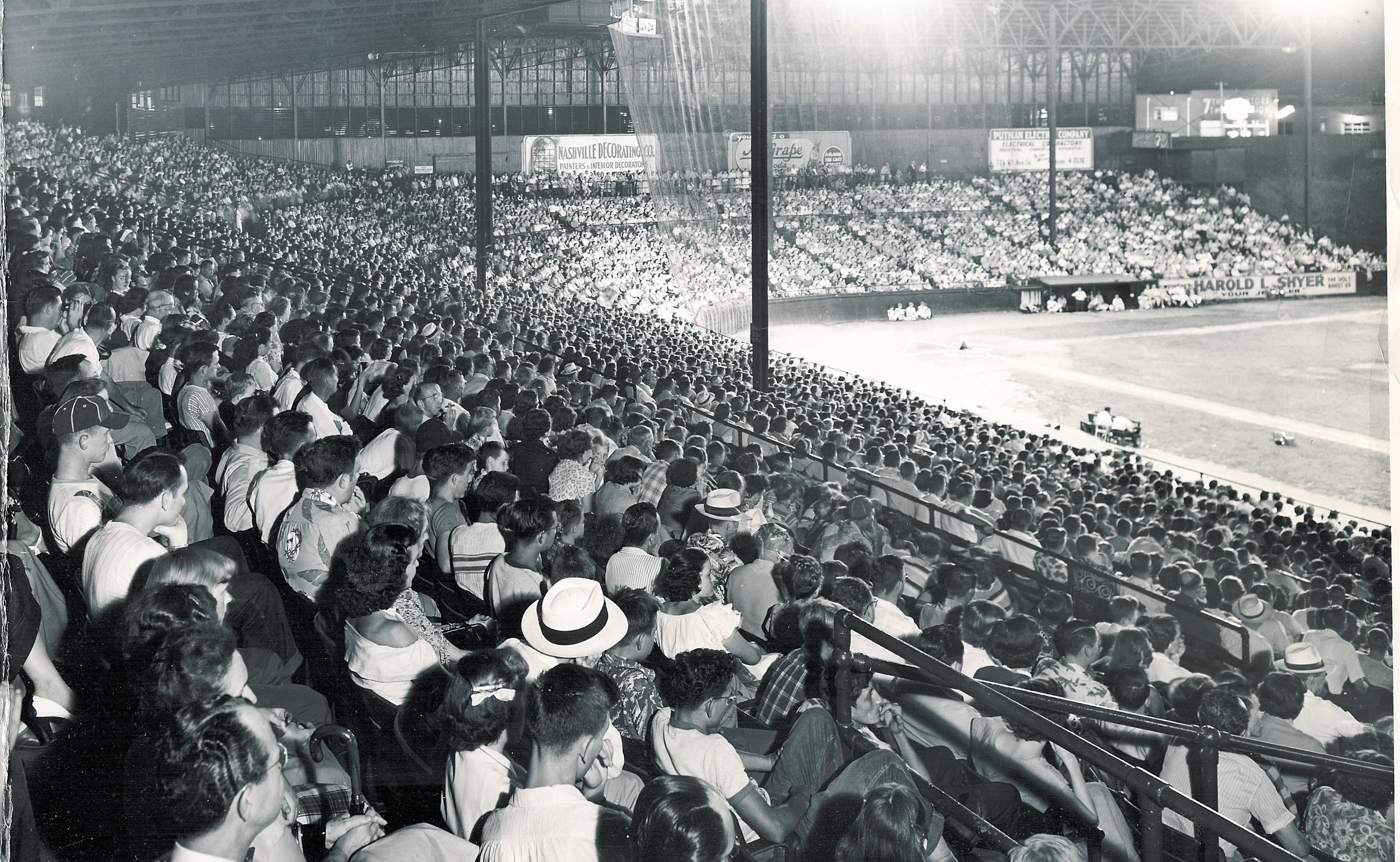
A baseball game at Sulphur Dell in the 1950s

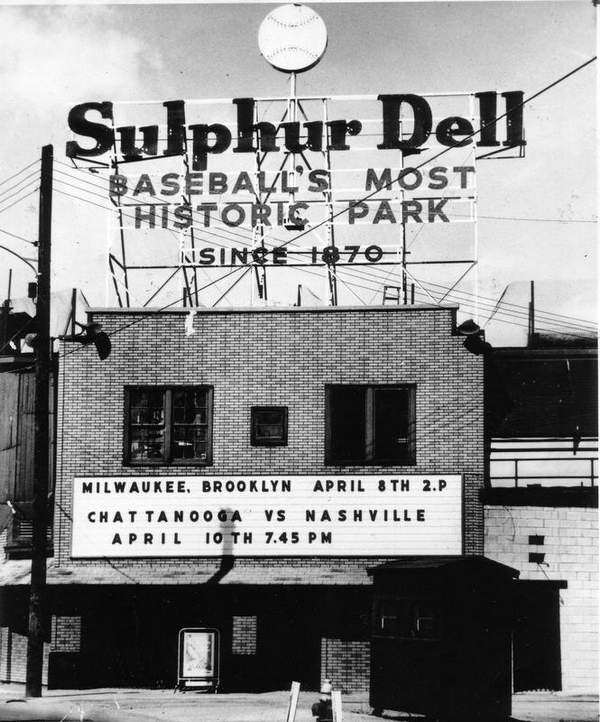
The front entrance marquee

The original grandstand at Sulphur Dell was situated with home plate facing the southwest toward the Tennessee State Capitol building. Consequently, batters would often have to compete with the afternoon sunlight shining in their eyes. After the 1926 season, the entire ballpark was demolished and rebuilt as a concrete-and-steel structure with home plate facing northeast along Fourth Avenue North.

Sulphur Dell's infamous outfield was born out of this realignment. The new distances to the park's outfield walls were 334 feet (102 m) to left field, 421 feet (128 m) to center, and 262 ft (80 m) to right. Even with such a short distance to right field, the ballpark had a significant "terrace" or sloping outfield: a steep incline that ran along the entire outfield wall, most dramatically in right and center fields. The top of the right field terrace was 22 1/2 feet (7 m) above the infield. Right fielders were often called "mountain goats" because they had to go up and down the hills in right-center and right. They usually played on the 10-foot-wide (3 m) "shelf" one-third of the way up the incline. Occasionally, the shelf was used for overflow seating, cutting the already-short right field distance to 235 ft (72 m).

The wooden outfield fence was 16 feet (5 m) high. The 186 foot (57 m) fence ran from the right field foul pole toward center field, where the fence was topped with a 30-foot (9 m) screen that decreased to 22 1/2 feet (7 m) high where it terminated in center field. A manually operated scoreboard was installed in left-center field that jutted out onto the field creating two unusually angled corners in which outfielders had to field balls. The seating capacity of the turned-around stadium was 7,000. Seats were painted green, except for reserved seats, which were painted orange. The first game at the reconfigured ballpark was an exhibition contest against the American Association's Minneapolis Millers, a 5–3 loss for the Vols.

The ballpark was nicknamed "Suffer Hell" by fielders who had to navigate the treacherous outfield, as well as by pitchers who frequently watched home runs disappear over the short fences. The park was also nicknamed "the Dump" because of the odor that drifted in from the nearby city dump. Babe Ruth, who came to the Dell for an exhibition game with the New York Yankees against the Vols, reportedly refused to play right field and was moved to left field for the game.

Located roughly a quarter mile from the Cumberland River, it was prone to flooding early in the season. The Vols frequently had to cancel or reschedule games or move them to Vanderbilt's McGugin Field. Even when the field was playable after heavy rain, the conditions led players to liken the field to "a drained-out washtub". The stands were very close to the field. First base was only 42 feet (12 m) from the stands, leading Casey Stengel to joke that he could bunt a home run down the first base line. Third base was even closer, at 26 feet (8 m).

Lights were added to the ballpark in 1931, and on May 18, the Vols played their first night game against the Mobile Marines. Nashville lost the contest, 8–1. In 1938, the seating capacity was expanded to 8,500.

In addition to the Vols playing their home games at Sulphur Dell, the minor Negro league Nashville Stars played there in 1942, as well as the Nashville Black Vols/Cubs from 1945 to 1951.

In 1951, the ballpark was updated with a remodeled facade, new turnstiles, brick walls, wider exits, and other improvements. The new front entrance had a marque which read, "Sulphur Dell, Baseball's Most Historic Park Since 1870". Ownership of the Nashville Vols was transferred to a public corporation, Vols, Inc., led by Herschel Lynn Greer in 1959. Prior to the start of that season, an organist's booth was built next to the press box, seats were repaired and repainted, and other general repairs were made.

The last Nashville Vols games, the last professional baseball games to be played at Sulphur Dell, were played on September 8, 1963. The Vols had joined the Double-A South Atlantic League after the Southern Association folded after the 1961 season and the team was inactive in 1962. In the doubleheader, the Vols defeated the Lynchburg White Sox in both games, 6–3 and 2–1. The Vols disbanded for good after the 1963 season.

=== Final years (1964–1969) ===
Photographs from 1963 show the final outfield dimensions as follows: left field foul line 335 feet (102 m), left center field 363 feet (111 m), center field corner 422 feet (129 m), right center field 321 feet (98 m) and right field foul line 262 feet (80 m).

Amateur baseball teams played at Sulphur Dell in 1964. The park was converted to a speedway for three weeks in 1965. The stadium then served as a tow-in lot for Metro Nashville, before being demolished on April 16, 1969. The remains of the recently demolished Andrew Jackson Hotel were used to fill in the site. It then became the location of a number of parking lots north of the Tennessee State Capitol until 2014. The site was also bisected by a stretch of the Music City Bikeway cycle path.

=== Baseball returns (2015) ===
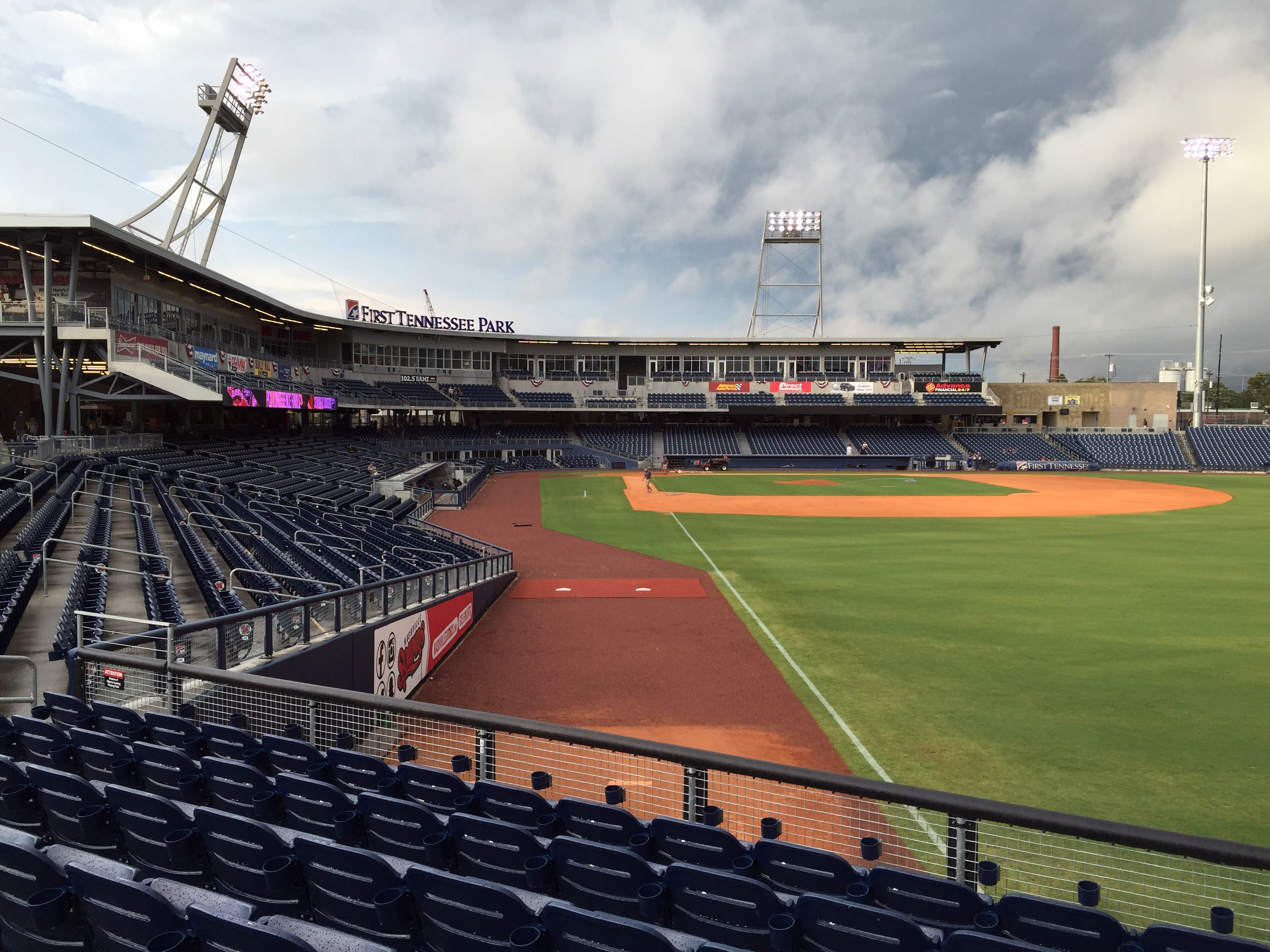
First Tennessee Park, opened in 2015, was built on the site of Sulphur Dell.

In August 2013, the city of Nashville was announced to be in negotiations with the State of Tennessee, owner the Sulphur Dell property, to build a ballpark at the location which would serve as the new home of the Nashville Sounds, a Minor League Baseball team of the Triple-A Pacific Coast League. A deal was reached on November 8, and final approval from city and state officials was received on December 10. A groundbreaking ceremony was held on January 27, 2014.

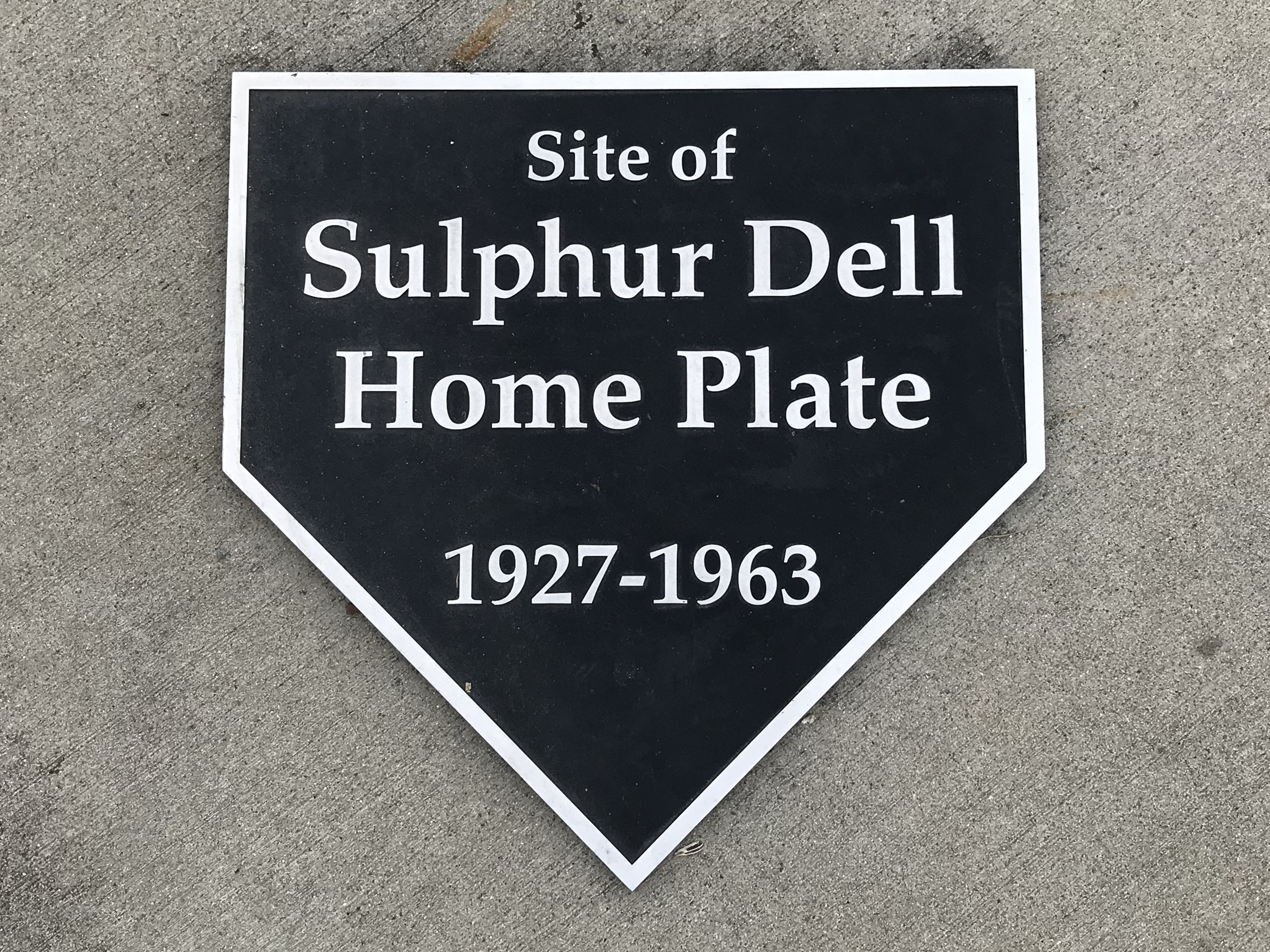
Site of home plate at First Tennessee Park

The stadium, First Tennessee Park, replaced Herschel Greer Stadium, the Sounds' home ballpark from 1978 to 2014. The facility seats up to 10,000 people, with 8,500 of that in fixed seating and the rest in open areas, such as a grass berm. The cost of the entire development, including commercial and retail space, a greenway, and a parking garage, was approximately $150 million; the stadium itself cost $47 million. First Tennessee Park opened on April 17, 2015. In the ballpark's inaugural game, the Sounds defeated the visiting Colorado Springs Sky Sox, 3–2, in 10 innings.

The new ballpark's design incorporates elements relating to Sulphur Dell. Light stanchions on the grandstand and outfield concourse resemble Sulphur Dell's lights. The back of the batter's eye has a tin sign marking the former location of Sulphur Dell's marquee declaring, "Site of Sulphur Dell, Baseball's Most Historic Park, 1870–1963". A plaque on the right field concourse marks the final location of Sulphur Dell's home plate. Displays about Sulphur Dell and the Vols are present throughout the park.

== All-Star Games ==
Sulphur Dell hosted the Southern Association All-Star Game on six occasions. Not only were the games held at Nashville's ballpark, but the Vols also served as the All-Star team's competition.

| Date | Winning team | Score | Losing team | Attendance |
|---|---|---|---|---|
| July 8, 1940 | All-Stars | 6–1 | Nashville Vols | 5,500 |
| July 9, 1943 | Nashville Vols | 3–2 | All-Stars | 9,350 |
| July 20, 1948 | Nashville Vols | 4–3 | All-Stars | 9,147 |
| July 12, 1949 | All-Stars | 18–6 | Nashville Vols | 11,442 |
| July 8, 1953 | All-Stars | 8–6 | Nashville Vols | 7,569 |
| July 17, 1957 | All-Stars | 7–6 | Nashville Vols | 7,542 |

== See also ==
- List of baseball parks in Nashville
