= Nashville Cubs =

Information
- League: Negro Southern League
- Location: Nashville, Tennessee
- Ballpark: Sulphur Dell
- Established: 1945
- Disbanded: 1951
- Nicknames: Nashville Black Vols (1945); Nashville Cubs (1946–1949, 1951); Louisville-Nashville Cubs (1950)

The Nashville Cubs were a Negro league baseball team that played in the minor league Negro Southern League from 1945 to 1951. The club was originally called the Nashville Black Vols, named after the all-white Nashville Vols of the minor league Southern Association, but changed to the Cubs moniker in 1946. They were located in Nashville, Tennessee, for the majority of their existence, but split part of the 1950 season between Nashville and Louisville, Kentucky, where they played as the Louisville Cubs. While in Nashville, they played their home games at Sulphur Dell. The Black Vols finished the 1945 season in fourth place with an 18–16 (.529) record. The 1949 team won the second half of the season.
