= Greenwood Cemetery (Nashville, Tennessee) =

Cemetery in the United States

Coordinates: 36.145°N 86.725°W

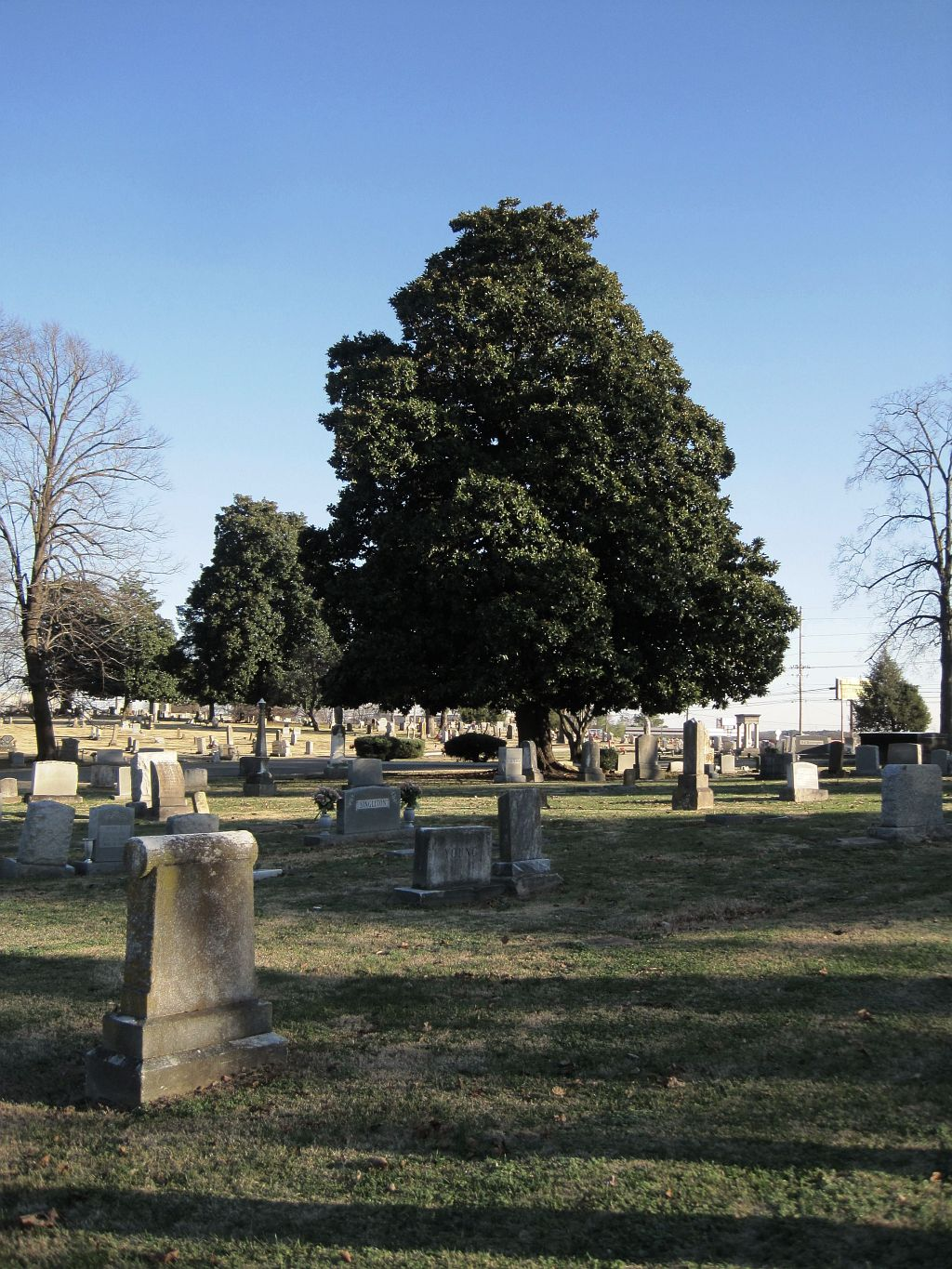
- A view of Greenwood Cemetery, December 2013
- Interactive map of Greenwood Cemetery

Details
- Established: 1888
- Location: 1428 Elm Hill Pike, Nashville

Greenwood Cemetery is situated at 1428 Elm Hill Pike, Nashville in Davidson County, Tennessee, United States. When opened in 1888, it was only the second cemetery in Nashville for African Americans.

== History ==
The cemetery was founded by local pastor and businessman Preston Taylor in 1888. Taylor had been born a slave in Louisiana in 1849. He settled in Nashville in 1884, where he became a well known minister and businessman. In 1887 he conceived the idea of establishing a cemetery for African Americans on 37 acres (15 ha) of land near Buttermilk Ridge at Elm Hill Road. He purchased the land in 1887 for $30,000, and in 1888 he established Greenwood Cemetery. Its purpose was to provide low cost, first class burial plots for African-American residents of Nashville.

Concurrently he established a mortuary, Taylor Funeral Company, at 449 North Cherry Street, now Fourth Avenue (not related to today's Taylor Funeral Home of Nashville). Taylor operated the cemetery himself until his death in 1931, bequeathing it to the National Christian Missionary Convention of the Christian Church (Disciples of Christ). The cemetery remains a nonprofit organization.

(Taylor also established Greenwood Park, the first park in Nashville open to African-Americans, in 1904.)

== Notable interments ==
When Taylor died in 1931 he was interred at Greenwood after a full week of memorial activities. His wife Georgia Gordon Taylor is also buried there.

Other notable individuals interred there include Arna Bontemps, William Edmondson (sculptor), Charles S. Johnson, John Merritt, James C. Napier, DeFord Bailey, Marshall Keeble, Mattie E. Coleman, Halle Tanner Dillon Johnson, and John Houston Burrus.

== See also ==
- List of cemeteries in the United States
