= Nashville Stars (baseball) =

Information
- League: Negro Major League (1942); Negro Southern League (1951)
- Location: Nashville, Tennessee
- Ballpark: Sulphur Dell
- Established: 1930s
- Disbanded: 1950s

The Nashville Stars were a semi-pro and minor league Negro league baseball team in the late 1930s through the early 1950s. The Stars played in the Negro Major League in 1942 and the Negro Southern League in 1951. They were located in Nashville, Tennessee, and played their home games at Sulphur Dell. Nashville newspapers from the era indicate the team held membership in the Negro Southern League in 1950 as well.

== Revival ==
In 2019, an investment group, Music City Baseball LLC, announced plans to secure a possible Major League Baseball expansion franchise or lure an existing team to Nashville that would be called the Nashville Stars in honor of the city's Negro league teams.
