= Tom Wilson Park =

Former baseball park in Nashville, Tennessee

- Interactive map of Tom Wilson Park
- Full name: Tom Wilson Park
- Location: Nashville, Tennessee; United States
- Coordinates: 36°8.718′N 86°45.864′W
- Owner: Thomas T. Wilson
- Capacity: 4,000 or 8,000
- Surface: Grass

Construction
- Opened: 1929
- Closed: 1946

Tenant
- Nashville Elite Giants (Indp./NNL1/NSL/NNL2) 1929–1930, 1932–1934

Tom Wilson Park is a former Negro league baseball park in Nashville, Tennessee, that opened in 1929 and closed in 1946. The ballpark has since been demolished.

== Park history ==
The ballpark, owned by Thomas T. Wilson, was centrally located in what was at the time Nashville's largest black community, known as Trimble Bottom, near the convergence of Second and Fourth Avenues, just north of the fairgrounds. The 8,000 (or 4,000) seat facility featured a single-decked, covered grandstand. It was one of only three Negro league venues that was built by the team owner specifically for the Negro league team. In 1946, Wilson resigned and discontinued all ball activities at Wilson Park.

== Tenants ==
Wilson Park was home to the Negro league Nashville Elite Giants baseball team who played in the first Negro National League, the first Negro Southern League, and the second Negro National League. In addition to hosting the home games of Wilson's Elite Giants, the ballpark also served as a spring training site for other Negro league teams, as well as white-only minor league teams, such as the Southern Association's Nashville Vols. Babe Ruth, Lou Gehrig, and Roy Campanella are known to have played at the park.

== See also ==
- List of baseball parks in Nashville
