= 1896 Southern League season =

- League: Southern League
- Sport: Baseball
- Duration: April 16 – August 16
- Teams: 6

Regular season
- League champions: New Orleans Pelicans

SL seasons
- ← 1895 1898 →

The 1896 Southern League was a Class B minor league baseball season played between April 16 and August 16. Six teams during the season with the top team winning the pennant.

The New Orleans Pelicans finished with the best record in the league, winning the Southern League championship.

== Team changes ==
- The Little Rock Travelers and Memphis Giants disbanded during the 1895 season and did not return to the league.
- The Evansville Blackbirds and Nashville Seraphs disbanded.
- The Birmingham Bluebirds rejoin the league. Previously, the club last played in the league during the 1893 season.
- The Columbus Babies join the league. Previously, the Columbus Stars played in the Southern League in the 1885 season.
- The Mobile Bluebirds are renamed to the Mobile Blackbirds.
- The Montgomery Grays are renamed to the Montgomery Senators.

== Teams ==
1896 Southern League
Team	City	Stadium
Atlanta Crackers	Atlanta, Georgia	Brisbine Park
Birmingham Bluebirds	Birmingham, Alabama	West End Park
Columbus Babies	Columbus, Georgia	Wildwood Park
Mobile Blackbirds	Mobile, Alabama	Frascati Park
Montgomery Senators	Montgomery, Alabama	Riverside Park
New Orleans Pelicans	New Orleans, Louisiana	Crescent City Base Ball Park

== Map of teams ==
Southern League teams

== Regular season ==
=== Summary ===
- The New Orleans Pelicans won the pennant for the third time in team history.
- On July 11, the Atlanta Crackers disbanded.
- On July 14, the Birmingham Bluebirds disbanded.
- On August 16, the league canceled the remainder of the season due to financial instability. The league would remain inactive in 1897.

=== Standings ===
Southern League
Team	Win	Loss	%	GB
New Orleans Pelicans	67	30	.691	–
Montgomery Senators	60	37	.619	7
Atlanta Crackers	36	36	.500	18.5
Mobile Bluebirds	39	59	.398	28.5
Birmingham Bluebirds	26	41	.388	26
Columbus Babies	35	60	.368	31

== League Leaders ==
=== Batting leaders ===
Stat	Player	Total
AVG	Edward Deady, Montgomery Senators	.371
H	Edward Deady, Montgomery Senators	154
R	Abner Powell, New Orleans Pelicans	97
2B	Jack Huston, New Orleans Pelicans; Joe Katz, Birmingham Bluebirds	27
3B	Ike Fisher, Mobile Blackbirds	15
HR	Ike Fisher, Mobile Blackbirds	10
SB	Abner Powell, New Orleans Pelicans	60

=== Pitching leaders ===
Stat	Player	Total
W	Lee Smith, New Orleans Pelicans	22
ERA	Skel Roach, Mobile Blackbirds	1.13
CG	Tully Sparks, Birmingham/Mobile	32
SHO	Lee Smith, New Orleans Pelicans	7
IP	Lee Smith, New Orleans Pelicans	293.0
SO	Lee Smith, New Orleans Pelicans	128

== See also ==
- 1896 Major League Baseball season
