= 1894 Southern League season =

- League: Southern League
- Sport: Baseball
- Duration: April 10 – July 8
- Teams: 8

Regular season
- League champions: Memphis Giants

SL seasons
- ← 1893 1895 →

The 1894 Southern League was a Class B minor league baseball season played between April 10 and July 8. Eight teams played during the season with the top team in each half of the season qualifying for the post-season.

On July 8, the season was canceled due to financial instabilities. The Memphis Giants were declared champions for the season.

== League news ==
- The league contracted from twelve teams to eight teams.

== Team changes ==
- The Augusta Electricians, Chattanooga Warriors, Montgomery Colts and Penscaola Pets disband.
- The Atlanta Windjammers are renamed to the Atlanta Atlantas.
- The Memphis Fever Germs are renamed to the Memphis Giants.
- The Mobile Blackbirds are renamed to the Mobile Bluebirds.
- The Savannah Electrics are renamed to the Savannah Modocs.

== Teams ==
1894 Southern League
Team	City	Stadium
Atlanta Atlantas	Atlanta, Georgia	Peters Park
Charleston Seagulls	Charleston, South Carolina	Ball Park Field
Macon Hornets	Macon, Georgia	Central City Park
Memphis Giants	Memphis, Tennessee	Athletic Park
Mobile Bluebirds; Atlanta Atlantas	Mobile, Alabama; Atlanta, Georgia	Frascati Park; Peters Park
Nashville Tigers	Nashville, Tennessee	Sulphur Spring Park
New Orleans Pelicans	New Orleans, Louisiana	Crescent City Base Ball Park
Savannah Modocs	Savannah, Georgia	Bolton Street Park

== Map of teams ==
Southern League teams

== Regular season ==
=== Summary ===
- The Memphis Giants won the pennant for the first time in team history.
- On June 27, the Atlanta Atlantas, Charleston Seagulls, Macon Hornets and Savannah Modocs disbanded.
- On June 28, the Mobile Bluebirds transferred to Atlanta, Georgia and continued the season as the Atlanta Atlantas.
- On July 8, the season ended due to financial instability.

=== Standings ===
Southern League
Team	Win	Loss	%	GB
Mobile Bluebirds/Atlanta Atlantas	43	23	.652	–
Memphis Giants	42	23	.646	0.5
Charleston Seagulls	33	22	.600	4.5
Savannah Modocs	30	26	.536	8
New Orleans Pelicans	33	38	.465	12.5
Nashville Tigers	30	37	.448	13.5
Atlanta Atlantas	21	37	.362	18
Macon Hornets	15	41	.268	23

== League Leaders ==
=== Batting leaders ===
Stat	Player	Total
AVG	Mark Polhemus, Charleston Seagulls	.383
H	Ollie Smith, Memphis Giants	147
R	Gus Klopf, Charleston Seagulls	83
2B	Jocko Fields, Charleston Seagulls	21
3B	Ollie Smith, Memphis Giants	12
HR	Count Campau, New Orleans Pelicans	11
SB	Count Campau, New Orleans Pelicans	50

=== Pitching leaders ===
Stat	Player	Total
W	Bill Kling, Mobile/Atlanta; Jack Wadsworth, Memphis Giants	16
CG	Jack Fanning, New Orleans Pelicans	23
SHO	Jack Wadsworth, Memphis Giants	4

== Playoffs ==
- The post-season was canceled due to the season ending early.
- The Memphis Giants were named champions.

== See also ==
- 1894 Major League Baseball season
