= 1893 Southern League season =

- League: Southern League
- Sport: Baseball
- Duration: April 10 – August 12
- Teams: 12

Regular season
- League champions: 1st half: Augusta Electricians; 2nd half: Macon Hornets

SL seasons
- ← 1892 1894 →

The 1893 Southern League was a Class B minor league baseball season played between April 10 and August 12. Twelve teams played during the season with the top team in each half of the season qualifying for the post-season.

Due to an outbreak of yellow fever, the league ended their season on August 12th and declared both the Augusta Electricians and Macon Hornets champions, as they each finished in first place in each half of the season.

== League news ==
- The league expanded to twelve teams and was split into East and West teams.

== Team changes ==
- The Augusta Electricians join the league. Previously, the Augusta Browns played in the Southern League, who disbanded during the 1886 season.
- The Charleston Sea Gulls join the league from the South Atlantic League. The Sea Gulls last played in the Southern League in 1889.
- The Nashville Tigers join the league. Previously, the Nashville Blues played in the Southern League, who disbanded during the 1887 season.
- The Savannah Electrics join the league. Previously, Savannah played in the Southern League, as the club disbanded during the 1887 season.
- The Atlanta Firecrackers are renamed to the Atlanta Windjammers.
- The Birmingham Grays discontinued their team name.
- The Chattanooga Chatts are renamed to the Chattanooga Warriors.
- Macon Central City are renamed to the Macon Hornets.
- The Memphis Giants are renamed to the Memphis Fever Germs.
- The Montgomery Lambs are renamed to the Montgomery Colts.

== Teams ==
1893 Southern League
Team	City	Stadium
Atlanta Windjammers	Atlanta, Georgia	Brisbine Park
Augusta Electricians	Augusta, Georgia	Warren Park
Birmingham; Pensacola Pets	Birmingham, Alabama; Pensacola, Florida	West End Park; Recreation Park
Charleston Sea Gulls	Charleston, South Carolina	Ball Park Field
Chattanooga Warriors	Chattanooga, Tennessee	Stanton Field
Macon Hornets	Macon, Georgia	Central City Park
Memphis Fever Germs	Memphis, Tennessee	Athletic Park
Mobile Blackbirds	Mobile, Alabama	Frascati Park
Montgomery Colts	Montgomery, Alabama	Riverside Park
Nashville Tigers	Nashville, Tennessee	Sulphur Spring Park
New Orleans Pelicans	New Orleans, Louisiana	Crescent City Base Ball Park
Savannah Electrics	Savannah, Georgia	Bolton Street Park

== Map of teams ==
Southern League teams

== Regular season ==
=== Summary ===
- The Augusta Electricians won the first half of the season.
- The Macon Hornets won the second half of the season.
- On July 28, Birmingham franchise was transferred to Pensacola, Florida and are renamed to the Pensacola Pets.
- On August 12, the remainder of the season was canceled due to a yellow fever outbreak.

=== Standings ===
Southern League
Team	Win	Loss	%	GB
Charleston Sea Gulls	51	32	.614	–
Macon Hornets	54	38	.587	1.5
Atlanta Windjammers	55	39	.585	1.5
Savannah Electrics	53	38	.582	2
Memphis Fever Germs	53	38	.582	2
Augusta Electricians	51	39	.567	3.5
Chattanooga Warriors	48	45	.516	8
New Orleans Pelicans	40	51	.440	15
Mobile Blackbirds	38	53	.418	17
Montgomery Colts	38	57	.400	19
Birmingham/Pensacola Pets	34	58	.370	21.5
Nashville Tigers	33	60	.355	23

== League Leaders ==
=== Batting leaders ===
Stat	Player	Total
AVG	Ed Cartwright, Memphis Fever Germs	.373
H	Ed Cartwright, Memphis Fever Germs	147
R	Ed Cartwright, Memphis Fever Germs	113
2B	Ed Cartwright, Memphis Fever Germs	31
3B	Charlie Abbey, Chattanooga Warriors; Bill Everitt, Augusta Electricians	10
HR	Bones Ely, Atlanta Windjammers	19

=== Pitching leaders ===
Stat	Player	Total
W	George Rettger, Atlanta Windjammers; Bill Whitrock, Memphis Fever Germs	23
CG	Charlie Petty, Savannah Electrics	36
SHO	Les German, Augusta Electricians	4

== Playoffs ==
- The post-season was canceled due to a yellow fever outbreak.
- The Augusta Electricians and Macon Hornets each were named co-pennant winners.

=== Playoff bracket ===
Finals
1	Augusta
2	Macon

== See also ==
- 1893 Major League Baseball season
