= 1895 Southern League season =

- League: Southern League
- Sport: Baseball
- Duration: April 25 – September 2
- Teams: 8

Regular season
- League champions: Nashville Seraphs

SL seasons
- ← 1894 1896 →

The 1895 Southern League was a Class B minor league baseball season played between April 25 and September 2. Eight teams during the season with the top team winning the pennant.

The Nashville Seraphs finished with the best record in the league, winning the Southern League championship.

== Team changes ==
- The Charleston Seagulls, Macon Hornets, Mobile Bluebirds and Savannah Modocs disbanded during the 1894 season and did not return to the league.
- The Evansville Blackbirds join the league as new team.
- The Little Rock Travelers join the league from the Arkansas State League.
- The Chattanooga Warriors rejoin the league. Previously, the club played in the Southern League in the 1893 before disbanding.
- The Montgomery Colts rejoin the league and are renamed to the Montgomery Grays. Previously, the club played in the Southern League in the 1893 before disbanding.
- The Atlanta Atlantas were renamed to the Atlanta Crackers.
- The Nashville Tigers were renamed to the Nashville Seraphs.

== Teams ==
1895 Southern League
Team	City	Stadium
Atlanta Crackers	Atlanta, Georgia	Peters Park
Chattanooga Warriors; Mobile Bluebirds	Chattanooga, Tennessee; Mobile, Alabama	Stanton Field; Frascati Park
Evansville Blackbirds	Evansville, Indiana	Louisiana Street Park
Little Rock Travelers	Little Rock, Arkansas	Kavanaugh Field
Memphis Giants	Memphis, Tennessee	Athletic Park
Montgomery Grays	Montgomery, Alabama	Riverside Park
Nashville Seraphs	Nashville, Tennessee	Sulphur Spring Park
New Orleans Pelicans	New Orleans, Louisiana	Crescent City Base Ball Park

== Map of teams ==
Southern League teams

== Regular season ==
=== Summary ===
- The Nashville Seraphs won the pennant for the first time in team history.
- Though the Atlanta Crackers and Nashville Seraphs ended the season tied for first place, a meeting of the league's directors resulted in the nullification of an August 10 game between the two in which the umpire improperly made an out call following fan interference. This ruling caused the Seraphs' winning percentage to rise to .676 (71–34) and Atlanta's to fall to .667 (68–34), making Nashville the pennant winner.
- On July 19, the Chattanooga Warriors transferred to Mobile, Alabama and continued the season as the Mobile Bluebirds.
- On July 22, the Memphis Giants disbanded.
- On July 23, the Little Rock Travelers disbanded.

=== Standings ===
Southern League
Team	Win	Loss	%	GB
Nashville Seraphs	71	34	.676	–
Atlanta Crackers	68	34	.667	1.5
Evansville Blackbirds	66	38	.635	4.5
Memphis Giants	32	37	.464	21
New Orleans Pelicans	46	55	.455	23
Chattanooga Warriors/Mobile Bluebirds	37	63	.370	31.5
Montgomery Grays	40	70	.364	33.5
Little Rock Travelers	25	47	.347	29.5

== See also ==
- 1895 Major League Baseball season
