= Nashville Tigers =

Former Minor League Baseball team in Nashville, Tennessee

- 1893–1894; Nashville, Tennessee
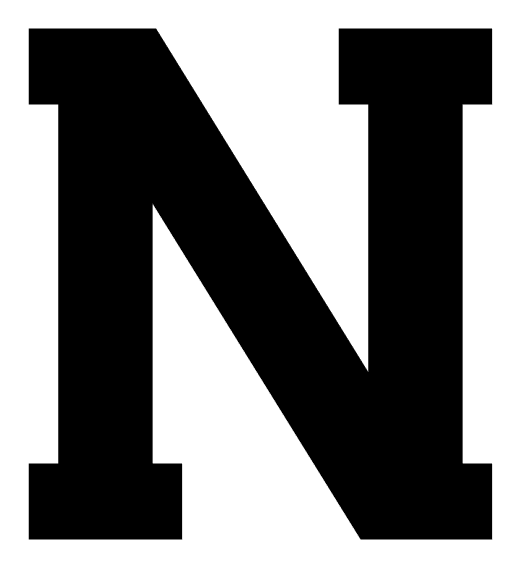

Minor league affiliations
- Class: Class B (1893–1894)
- League: Southern League (1893–1894)

Minor league titles
- Pennants (0): None

Team data
- Name: Nashville Tigers (1893–1894)
- Colors: Black, white (1894) Golden brown, seal brown (1894) Gray, red (1893)
- Ballpark: Athletic Park (1893–1894)
- Manager: George Stallings (1894); Dusty Miller (1893); Ted Sullivan (1893)

The Nashville Tigers were a minor league baseball team that played in the Class B Southern League from 1893 to 1894. They were located in Nashville, Tennessee, and played their home games at Athletic Park, later known as Sulphur Dell.

Under the management of Ted Sullivan, the Tigers finished the first series of 1893 in last place out of twelve teams. Their play was hampered by a preponderance of injured players, which led to high roster turnover and the frequent substitution of local amateur players to make out a full lineup. Consequently, the once robust attendance at Athletic Park declined as the season progressed, eventually putting the team in such dire financial condition that Sullivan surrendered the franchise to the league. They fared better in the second series and were in eighth place on August 12 when circuit-wide financial problems forced the league to disband.

Reminiscent of the previous year, the 1894 Nashvilles found themselves last out of eight teams just one month into the season. In contrast, manager George Stallings made a series of roster moves that strengthened the team, enabling it to move up to sixth place by the close of the first series on June 27. On that date, the league was reorganized as a four-team circuit since financial problems had forced half of its teams to drop out. The Tigers played the first night game in Nashville some 40 years before the first Major League Baseball game was played at night. On July 7, nine games into the second series, Nashville, sitting atop the standings, disbanded as Stallings and other managers sensed the impending total collapse of the league, which occurred on July 11.

A total of 69 players competed in at least one game for Nashville across both seasons. Of these, 40 also played for major league teams. Among the players who went on to have notable major league careers were Bill Hoffer, Con Lucid, Dusty Miller, John O'Brien, Bill Phillips, and George Stallings.

== History ==
=== Formation ===
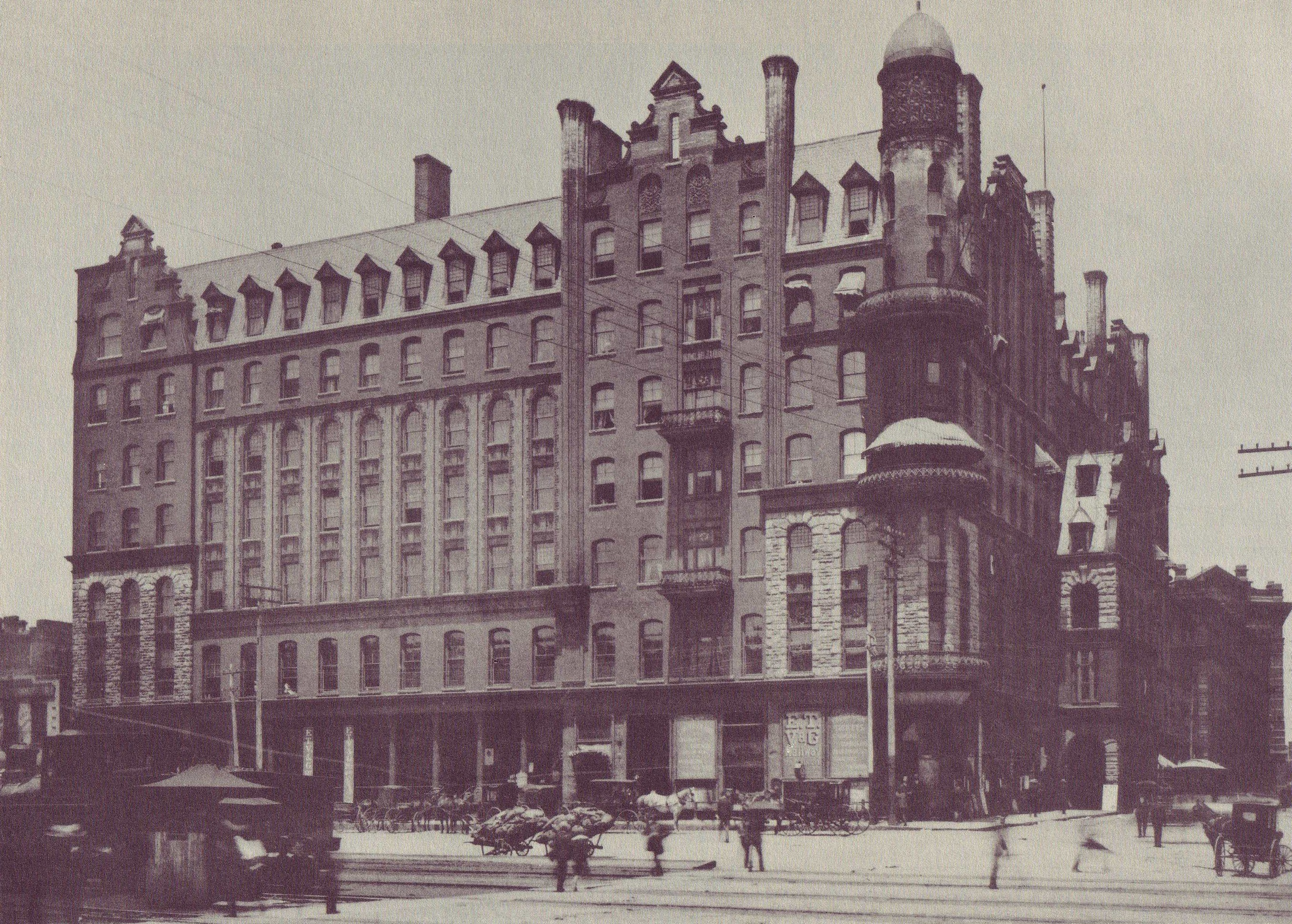
A Southern League franchise was granted to Nashville on October 31, 1892, at the Kimball House in Atlanta.

Professional baseball was first played in Nashville, Tennessee, by the Nashville Americans, who were charter members of the original Southern League from 1885 to 1886 and played their home games at Sulphur Spring Park, later renamed Athletic Park and Sulphur Dell. This ballpark was to be the home of Nashville's minor league teams through 1963. In 1887, the city's Southern League team was called the Nashville Blues. The club suffered financially from poor attendance throughout the season to the extent that they chose to withdraw from the league and disband on August 6 after losing nearly US$18,000 in an effort to cut their losses. Nashville did not field another professional team for the next five years.

As early as August 1892, while that season was still being played, a few groups were interested in securing a Southern League franchise for Nashville for the next season. At the league's annual meeting on October 31, held at the Kimball House in Atlanta, the league elected to expand from eight teams to twelve for the 1893 season. New franchises were issued to Augusta, Charleston, Nashville, and Savannah, which joined the existing circuit consisting of Atlanta, Birmingham, Chattanooga, Memphis, Mobile, Montgomery, Macon, and New Orleans. The Nashville franchise was awarded to Ted Sullivan, who previously owned and managed the Chattanooga franchise. The teams pledged to pay a $250 deposit to guarantee they would play the entire season. They later agreed to set aside 3% of the gross proceeds of each game for a sinking fund to keep the league on firm financial ground. Player salaries were capped at $1,000 with a penalty of forfeiture of games for exceeding that amount.

In the weeks leading up to the season, Southern League teams acquired nicknames from their local fans and sportswriters. The Nashvilles were variously referred to as the "Hibernians", owing to Sullivan's Irish heritage, and the "Bluffers", the nickname of spring training player Josh Conley. Sullivan did not want his team called by either of these names. Instead, he preferred "Nashville Tigers". Both of the city's daily newspapers, The Daily American and Nashville Banner, followed suit by using the moniker in coverage of Nashville's games.

=== The first season ===
==== Spring training 1893 ====
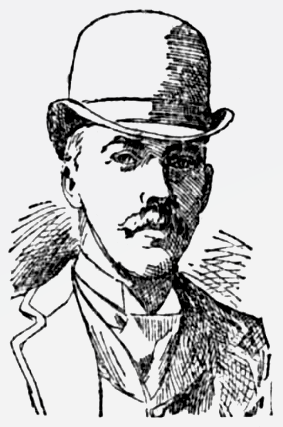
Ted Sullivan, manager of the 1893 Nashville Tigers

Ted Sullivan, who was to manage the Nashville club, secured the lease for Athletic Park and began to sign players. He sought out men he considered to be dependable and who were known as experienced, skilled ballplayers. Nine of the thirteen who began the season with Nashville had prior experience on major league teams. Some of the more seasoned major leaguers Sullivan acquired were Sam LaRocque, Tom O'Brien, and Tom Vickery. Another was Bill Geiss, who also played for the 1885 Nashville Americans. Sullivan himself had played a few major league games and had managed big league clubs including the 1884 Union Association champion St. Louis Maroons.

Players were to report to Nashville by March 18 for several weeks of practice and exhibition games before the beginning of the season on April 10. A few of these exhibitions were played against teams from the National League, the only major league at the time, who traveled south to prepare for their seasons in a warmer climate. Their first two tuneup games were versus the St. Louis Browns on March 23 and 24 at Athletic Park. The Browns won the first game, 10–3. In the second day's game, St. Louis' players walked off the field in the bottom of the seventh inning following a disagreement with the umpire. They refused to continue playing, and, though leading 8–6 at the time, the umpire awarded the game to Nashville on forfeit. The Baltimore Orioles visited Nashville for two games on April 7 and 8. The National Leaguers won the first contest, 3–0. The second game resulted in a 9–9 tie when it was called on account of darkness after nine innings.

Other exhibition games were played against amateur, collegiate, and minor league teams. The Tigers defeated the Vanderbilt Commodores, 18–11, in a March 25 game that was halted after eight innings due to darkness. They bested the Vanderbilts again on March 30 and 31, 11–0 and 9–1. Nashville beat a picked team from Louisville, 18–11, on March 27. They split an April 3 doubleheader with the Chattanooga Warriors, losing the first game, 16–7, and winning the second, 8–6. The teams then traveled to Chattanooga for two more games on April 4 and 5. Nashville lost both by scores of 5–3; the second game was called after the sixth inning on account of rain. On April 6, on the way home from Chattanooga, the Tigers defeated the Sewanee collegiate team on their grounds, 7–5.

==== The first series of 1893 ====
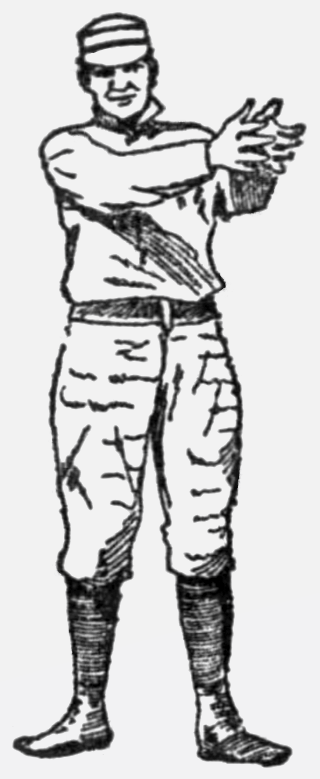
Joe Burke was one of only two Tigers to play the entire season.

The Southern League played a double, or split, season wherein two pennants were awarded, one to the winner of each series. The winners would then play each other for the league's championship. The Nashville Tigers were set to begin the first series of 1893 at Memphis on April 10. Their Opening Day roster consisted of pitchers Albert Boxendale, Thomas Gillen, Bill Phillips, and Tom Vickery; catcher Kid Summers; first baseman Tom O'Brien; second baseman Reddy Mack; third basemen Joe Burke and Bill Geiss; shortstop Sam LaRocque; left fielder DeLoss Wood; center fielder Dusty Miller; and right fielder Bill Krieg.

Prior to the season opener, the Tigers and the Memphis Fever Germs were paraded behind a brass band through the streets of Memphis to Citizens' Park. Nashville took an early lead with four runs scored in the first, but came out on the losing end of a back-and-forth battle in the late innings, losing 9–7. They were defeated again the next day. After game three was rained out, the teams traveled to Nashville for the Athletic Park home opener on April 13. Memphis scored four runs in the first off of Phillips, who was pulled without recording a single out. His reliever, Boxendale, retired the side and did not allow the Memphians to score again. The Tigers came back with a seven-run second inning, giving the home team all the runs they needed to secure their first win of the season, 8–4, before a crowd of approximately 1,200 people. The first in a profusion of season-long roster moves began that day. Geiss, who played the first two games at third base, left the team when Burke was slotted to hold down third in the home opener. Phillips, allegedly upset with what Sullivan said upon removing him from the mound, deserted the team after the game. Nashville and Memphis met again in a doubleheader on April 15 to make up for the previous day's rainout, each winning one game.

The Tigers then embarked on a lengthy road trip for the remainder of the month. For the benefit of hometown fans, telegraphed descriptions of road games were to be announced at the Olympic Theatre throughout the season. Outscored by opponents 109–80, Nashville won only four out of twelve games on the road. They returned home on May 1 in ninth place at 6–11 (.353), but they were expected to make up ground over the course of the upcoming month-long homestand. In an effort to improve pitching during the trip, Sullivan added Bill Hoffer to the team on April 21. He also released Tom O'Brien at the end of the trip due to his struggles at the plate and acquired Josh Conley to take over at first base on May 2, but he was released on May 6 for the same reason. Billy O'Brien, of the 1886 Americans, was brought in to play the position on May 4.

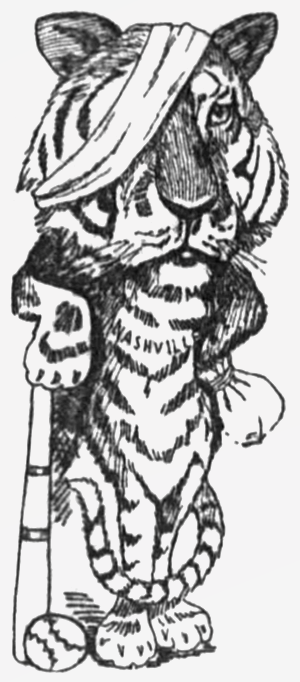
A Nashville Banner illustration indicative the Tigers' 1893 season

One bright spot of the homestand occurred on May 9 when the recently acquired Hoffer nearly no-hit the Montgomery Colts. He allowed only one hit, a ground rule double, and walked four batters in the 8–0 Tigers win. Wet grounds at Athletic Park necessitated a premature end to the Nashville games on June 2 and the transfer of the upcoming series with the Atlanta Windjammers to the away team's grounds. On May 29, the battered Tigers had dropped into last place. Despite Sullivan's assurance that the team would move out of the cellar and into the pennant chase, they ended the homestand on June 2 having won 10 games and lost 12, a marginal improvement, standing at 16–23 (.410). Sullivan was criticized by the Nashville press for drawing the highest attendance in the Southern League while having one of the worst on-field performances and cheapest payrolls. The Nashville Banner hypothesized that unless he invested in higher-caliber players, the citizens of Nashville would not long continue their faithful patronage of such an under-performing team.

Seeking to improve matters, Sullivan began making major roster moves in mid May that continued throughout the first half. Changes were so frequent that players were added and subtracted in almost every series. Vickery, frustrated by his own pitching in a May 18 outing, requested and received his release, but recanted days later and was welcomed back. Nearly three weeks afterward, still struggling on the mound, Sullivan let him go after a loss on June 3. Pitcher Gillen, dealing with a nagging preseason injury, was released after a disappointing outing on May 20. Fellow twirler Boxendale jumped the team on June 1, dissatisfied with his standing in the club. Center fielder Paul Hines, added on May 24, was released four days later due to his poor hitting and fielding along with second baseman Mack, whose indifferent play lost ball games and irked fans. Outfielders Krieg and Wood were dismissed on June 2. Shortstop William Wetterer, who joined on May 27, left the team to be with his dying wife on June 9. Outfielder Tom Letcher, added on June 5, left on June 16 to attend to his ill wife. O'Brien was lost after suffering an injury requiring hospitalization on June 28.

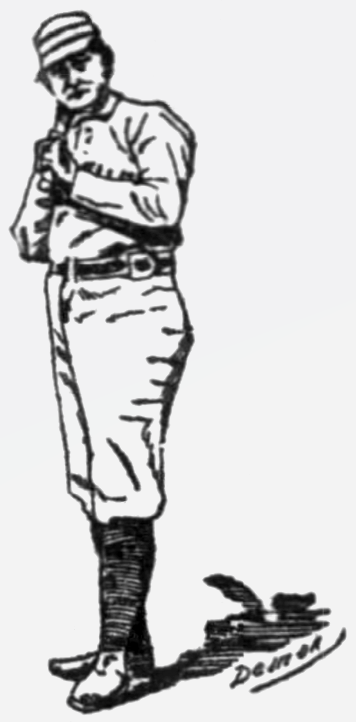
Billy O'Brien was one of numerous players lost to injury during the season.

To compensate for these losses, Sullivan added catcher Daniel Boland (June 5), pitcher Jack Keenan (June 7), shortstop Mart McQuaid (June 10), shortstop Leiter (June 14), pitcher Bully Turner (June 16), outfielder Billy York (June 20), pitcher Con Lucid (June 26), first baseman Charlie Newman (June 27), outfielders Pat Ready and Laird (June 30), and outfielders Hughes and Sowders (July 4). Sullivan even played himself in right field and pitched a few games beginning on June 20.

Though he attempted to strengthen the team with new players, Sullivan had a habit of signing men who were released by other dissatisfied Southern League clubs. Lucid pitched poorly with Macon, Newman was let go by Memphis, and McQuaid was released by Chattanooga for drunkenness. He also fielded amateurs he found on the road. Turner was removed from the mound after two batters without retiring a one in his only game. Novice outfielders Hughes, Laird, Ready, Sowders, and York also all appeared in one game each before they vanished from the team's lineup. McQuaid was only needed for four games before his release on June 13. Leiter lasted just over two weeks at shortstop before his unaccounted for departure on June 29.

The first series came to a close on July 4 with Nashville losing both games of its doubleheader at the Charleston Seagulls, 7–1 and 9–8. Since hitting the road on June 3, the Tigers had managed to win only three games and lose twenty-one. They ended the first series in twelfth place (last) with a record of 20–44 (.313), 25 1/2 games behind the first half champion Augusta Electricians. Sullivan wrote The Daily American with a letter to fans expressing regret for the Tigers' first half performance and pledging to assemble an aggregation of players for the second series of which the city could be proud. At the start of the season, large crowds came out to Athletic Park in support of their Tigers, but that enthusiasm was on the wain. By June 13, when the team was squarely in last place, accounts of their road games at the Olympic were discontinued. Both the American and the Banner supposed far lower turnout was to be expected in the second series if the team continued in the same manner as in the first.

==== The second series of 1893 ====
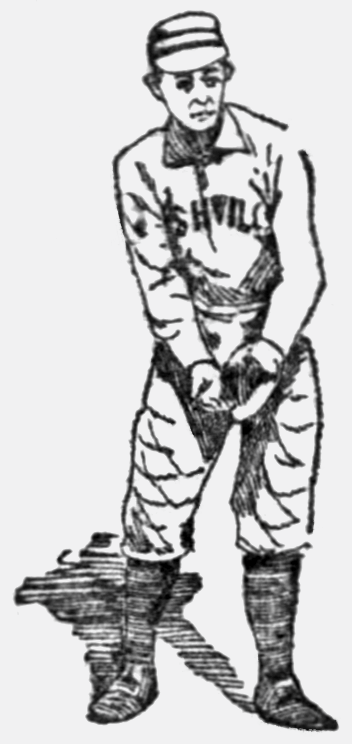
Kid Summers was one of four Opening Day Tigers to reach the second series.

The Tigers were slated to commence the second series with 15 games at Athletic Park beginning on July 6. Only 10 of the 32 players to compete for Nashville in the first half were still with the team at the start of the second, and only four remained from the Opening Day roster. Still on board for the second Opening Day were pitchers Hoffer and Keenan; catcher Summers; first baseman Newman; second baseman LaRocque; third baseman Burke; outfielders Boland, Lucid, and Miller; and manager Sullivan, who occasionally played right field and pitched. Sullivan reiterated his intention to strengthen the team for the second series and began with the addition of outfielder Smith, who played in the July 6 opener, as well as shortstop Harry Truby, who arrived July 7.

Nashville took an early lead in the second series opener until Memphis tied things up in the fifth inning at 5–5. The Fever Germs scored two go-ahead runs in the sixth, but Nashville answered with two of its own in the seventh, making it 7–7. Still tied after nine innings, the Tigers went up 8–7 in the top of the tenth, but allowed two Memphis runs to score in the bottom half, losing 9–8, before a scant audience of about 500 people. Adding to the team's troubles, LaRocque was a no-show and Keenan and Lucid both sprained their ankles running the bases. Lucid remained in the game, but Keenan had to be replaced by Nashville Athletic Club player Newt Fisher. The next day's game was also a loss behind the pitching of John Dolan on loan from the St. Louis Browns; he was returned after the game. The Tigers recorded their first win of the new season on July 8, defeating Memphis 8–5. Outfielder Harry Berte joined the team on July 13. LaRocque failed to appear for the July 14 game, alcohol being the cause, and was released.

As the homestand continued, a new problem began to loom. Sullivan deemed the club a financial failure, blaming the hardships and injuries incurred by his players for poor turnout and, consequently, low profits. A group of Nashville investors, led by businessman Perry A. Hughes, formed a corporation intent on purchasing the Tigers. Despite offering the team at what was deemed a reasonable figure, the group was hesitant to agree to its purchase. League president J. B. Nicklin decreed that either the parties come to terms for the sale before the Tigers left on their next road trip or the Southern League would assume control of the franchise and operate it through the season's close. On July 22, the sale seemed imminent, but it fell through when monthly player salary expenses were found to be higher than the figure originally presented. Sullivan telegraphed Nicklin, who informed the manager to conduct the Tigers to their next stop in Montgomery on July 24; from there, the league would run the franchise.

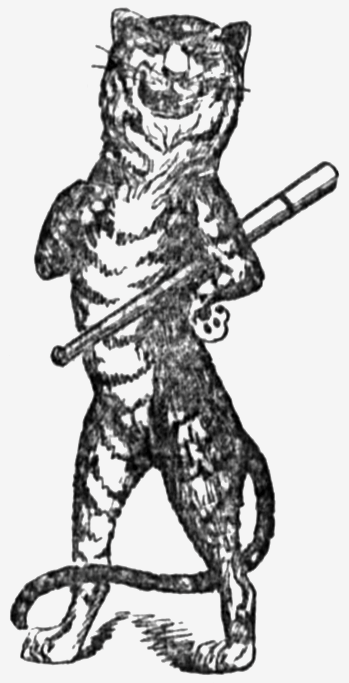
A Nashville Banner illustration reflecting the Tigers' second series success at Athletic Park

While the sale of the club was being negotiated, the team was performing much better and attendance was rising. On July 19, the Tigers attained fourth place, their highest standing all season. Owing to returning fan enthusiasm, the Olympic Theatre planned to resume providing descriptions of road games, and the Climax Saloon on Cherry Street (Fourth Avenue North) would begin doing the same. Sullivan, even in the midst of exiting the team, continued to tinker with the roster. Lucid was released on July 17, after making only one appearance since spraining his ankle, and Berte left on July 24. Though Sullivan received offers to sell off top players for his own financial gain, he refused to weaken the team and even added a player, second baseman Dick Phelan on July 22. It was thought that with the addition of another good pitcher, the team could be a serious contender for the pennant. On July 23, after the completion of the first homestand, the Tigers were still in fourth place with a record of 9–6 (.600).

Keenan was hard hit by Montgomery in the first road game on July 24, a 14–5 loss, and released afterward. This left Hoffer, who pitched the next day, as the Tigers' only pitcher. As he had earlier in the season, Sullivan put himself on the mound in July 26's game. He got along fine until the fifth inning when he allowed six runs and had Miller move into the box from center field as his relief in the 6–5 loss. Sullivan offered to continue managing the Tigers if the city would put forth $500 for his services. Instead, he left the Tigers at Montgomery on July 26, and Miller was placed in charge of the club as a player-manager.

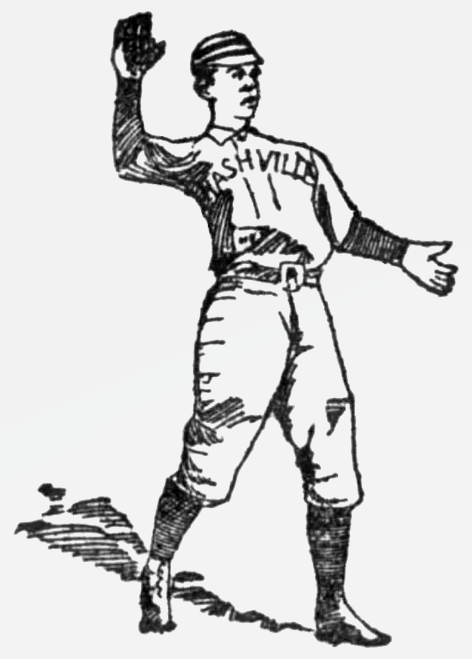
Dusty Miller became the Tigers' player-manager after Ted Sullivan's departure.

While at Montgomery, the Tigers were left waiting for President Nicklin to send the necessary funds to cover their boarding expenses, salaries, and train tickets to the next series in New Orleans. Also during the delay, Summers, the team's catcher since Opening Day, received and accepted an offer to join the St. Louis Browns. The funds finally arrived, albeit late, causing them to miss the next day's game against the New Orleans Pelicans. When they did reach the city, they had only eight men, not enough for July 29's game. So, they used local amateur Frank LaCourage in left field for the three-game series and acquired King Bailey, previously of the Pelicans, who pitched the first game of a July 30 doubleheader. Phelan parted ways with the team after July 30's games, and Smith left after August 8. These loses initiated the acquisitions of shortstop Bob Langsford (August 4), outfielder Sullivan (August 10), and single-game center fielder Hanley (August 10).

Nashville was not the only Southern League team facing obstacles that season. The Birmingham Grays/Blues were forced to disband for financial reasons, but the league assumed control of the team and transferred it to Pensacola on July 27. In an effort to decrease travel expenses and keep the league going, it was split into two divisions wherein teams would only play against opponents in their own division. About two weeks later, the Charleston Seagulls quit the league, and Atlanta and Augusta were expected to soon do the same. The league met in Atlanta on August 11 and decided to end the season on August 12. The death of the league was blamed on the circuit being too large with its cities too far apart, an awkward schedule with month-long homestands and road trips, poor attendance, high player salaries, and an outbreak of yellow fever resulting in the quarantining of the Pensacola team.

The Tigers closed out the season with a doubleheader at Memphis on August 12. They won the first game, 11–8, but lost the second, 7–4. They compiled a second series record of 13–16 (.448), which put them in eighth place, 8 1/2 games behind Macon. Their composite full season record was 33–60 (.355), the worst of the league's 12 teams.

Nashville and Memphis played two exhibition games on August 13 and 14, with Memphis winning the first, 10–4, and Nashville winning the second, 6–5. The Southern League had failed to pay the Tigers for the last two weeks of the season, and some players had their season earnings tied up in suspended banks. Miller arranged with the Nashville Athletic Club to play two benefit games with the full proceeds going to his players. The Tigers and Athletics shuffled their rosters so as to make for more even contests. About 200 people attended each of the games at Athletic Park, which were played and enjoyed in good spirits. Those in the amateur's uniforms won the first day's game, 4–1, while the professionals won the second day's, 1–0. The Tigers disbanded on August 16 after the final benefit game.

=== Reorganization ===
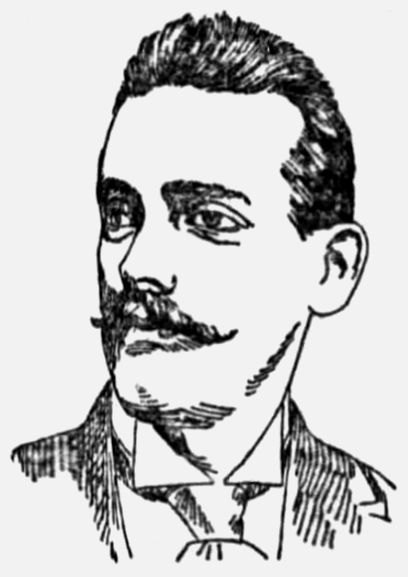
George Stallings, player-manager of the 1894 Nashvilles

In late August 1893, George Stallings, manager of the Augusta club, came to Nashville to explore the prospect of acquiring the forfeited Southern League franchise and returning it to the city for the next season. He had offered to take over the 1893 team from Sullivan with the stated intention of selling off its best players, but both Sullivan and President Nicklin ignored the offer. Stallings met with local businessmen to discuss forming a stock company to finance the team, though nothing developed. Instead, he went in financially with Charles Dooley, who had played for him in Augusta and was to be Nashville's first baseman.

On November 6, delegates from the cities previously represented in the Southern League met at the Southern Hotel in Chattanooga to reorganize for the 1894 season. They elected to operate as an eight-team circuit with clubs in Atlanta, Augusta, Charleston, Memphis, Mobile, Nashville, New Orleans, and Savannah. Macon was later substituted for Augusta. The Nashville franchise was granted to Stallings. It was decided that the season would be contested as one season rather than two halves as it had been previously. All teams were required to put up $250 to guarantee they would play the entire season. Plus, 3% of gross gate receipts were to be deposited in a sinking fund. Visiting teams were promised half of the gate receipts with a minimum of $60 per game. A $1,000 player salary limit was to be strictly-enforced.

Though modern baseball historians refer to the 1894 Nashville team as the Tigers, contemporary sportswriters did not. Instead, local newspapers ascribed that moniker to Ted Sullivan's new Atlanta team. As was common at the time, baseball clubs were often referred to only by the names of their cities. Accordingly, both of Nashville's daily newspapers called the team simply Nashville or the Nashvilles.

=== The second season ===
==== Spring training 1894 ====
By early January, Stallings, who would lead the club as a player-manager, had begun acquiring men. Five of the eleven who made the Opening Day roster had previously played on major league teams. There was some question, however, as to where the team would play. In November 1893, the Nashville Athletic Club, which leased Athletic Park from the city, sublet the grounds to E. G. Connette of the United Electric Railway under the impression that he was acting on behalf of Stallings. In February 1894, Connette offered to lease the park to Stallings for a given percentage of the gate receipts. Stallings balked at the proposal and threatened to take his team to Montgomery. Connette gave up the option, and Stallings secured a lease directly from the Athletic Club.

With the ballpark business settled, players were ordered to report to Nashville by March 12 to prepare for the season. Some were late to arrive, leaving no time for practice before their first game. Nevertheless, the Tigers shutout the Athletic Club, 10–0, on March 17. They also defeated the Vanderbilt Commodores, 25–3 and 21–2, on March 26 and 31. As to exhibitions with other professional teams, Nashville held two series against clubs from the Western League, a forerunner to the American League. The first was a three-game series against the Sioux City Cornhuskers from March 27 to 30. The Cornhuskers won the first and third games, 10–8 and 10–2, while the Tigers won the second, 6–4. The other series was versus the Detroit Creams from April 5 to 7. Nashville won the first two games, 15–10 and 8–6. The third game was a 7–7 draw when it was called on account of darkness after nine innings.

==== The first series of 1894 ====
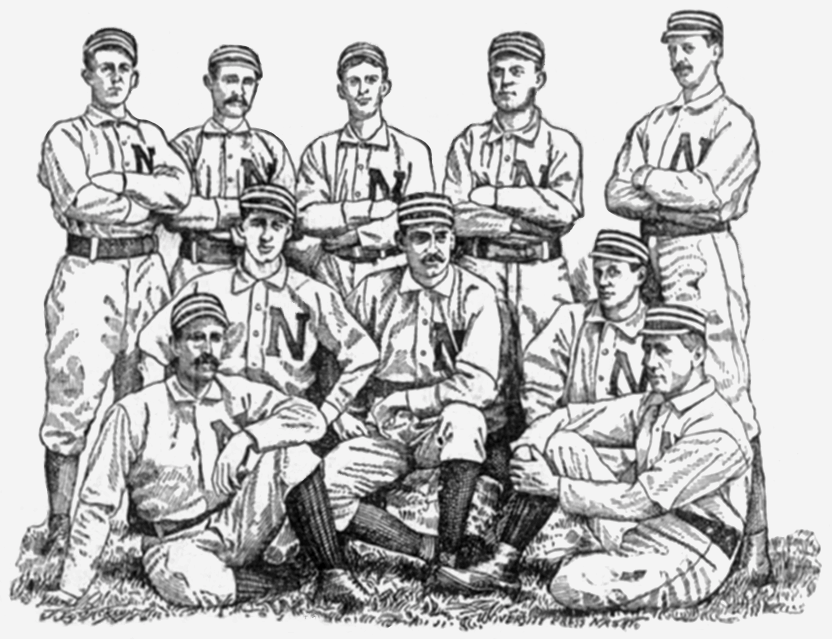
The Tigers' 1894 Opening Day roster

The Nashville Tigers were to open the 1894 season at home against the Memphis Giants on April 11. The Opening Day roster consisted of pitchers George Borchers and Jacob Lookabaugh; catcher George Stallings (acting as a player-manager); first baseman Charles Dooley; second baseman John O'Brien; third baseman Milt Whitehead; shortstop Jim Collopy; left fielder Jack Meara; center fielders George Cleve and Edward Webster; and right fielder Pete Sweeney.

Both teams were paraded behind a brass band through the streets of Nashville to Athletic Park. Approximately 2,000 people braved the day's chilly weather to welcome professional baseball back to the capital city. Mayor George Blackmore Guild gave a speech and then tossed out the first pitch before the game got underway. President Nicklin was also in attendance. Each team played well, but there was no winner as the game was called due to darkness in the top of the ninth inning with the score tied, 8–8. In the next afternoon's game, it looked like the Tigers would be victorious, holding a 10–9 lead in the ninth, but two Memphis runs resulted in an 11–10 loss for the home team. Nashville recorded its first win of the season on April 13 thanks to a seven-run eighth inning, besting the Giants, 13–6. The Nashvilles then left for a series at New Orleans. Detailed descriptions of games were to be provided via telegraph at Baxter Court and, later, the Olympic Theatre.

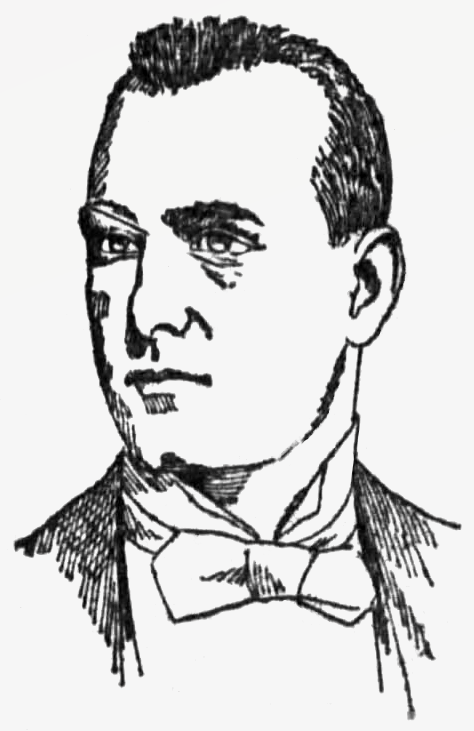
George Borchers pitched in more games than any other 1894 Tigers twirler.

Before they left, both Collopy and Whitehead had fallen ill with fevers and fatigue, and the rest of the team became sick in due course. To make matters worse, Collopy, playing through illness, was hit in the head by a pitched ball on April 19 at Mobile leaving him bedridden and under a physician's care. Stallings added outfielder Abner Powell on April 22 to compensate for the slack created by injury and illness. He also acquired the pitcher Peralto, who tossed a gem of a game against the Savannah Modocs in his April 24 debut, allowing only two hits and no earned runs in a tough-luck 3–1 loss. Collopy returned to the diamond on April 28, and Cleve and Webster were released the same day.

By the end of April, sitting in seventh place out of eight teams with a 4–10 (.286) record, the Nashville club started to resemble the previous season's Tigers. The team was playing well on an individual basis, but under performing as a group. Pitching was a key weakness, so hurler Sam Moran was added to the lineup on May 2. The Nashvilles returned home on May 9, still in seventh place, with Stallings looking for skilled players that could strengthen the team. One such player was catcher William Kinsler, added to the battery on May 10. Following a three-game winning streak against the New Orleans Pelicans from May 9 to 11, Nashville looked to be improving. However, they proceeded to lose the next nine games, during which time they dropped to last place on May 16.

Peralto was released on May 14 on the heels of several bad outings as Stallings had no time to develop the twirler; he needed pitchers who were already playing at a professional level. A series of unfortunate incidents occurred during and after that day's game. Borchers was taken off the mound by team captain Powell. In the dressing-room after the game, Powell verbally berated Borchers, who retaliated by punching the captain in the face. Their teammates intervened to prevent further violence. That evening at the Nicholson House hotel, Borchers approached Powell in an attempt to apologize, but Powell misinterpreted his intentions and broke his cane over Borchers' head drawing blood. The next day, both men were fined by Stallings, Borchers was suspended, and Powell requested and received his release from the team. Sweeney was made the new captain.

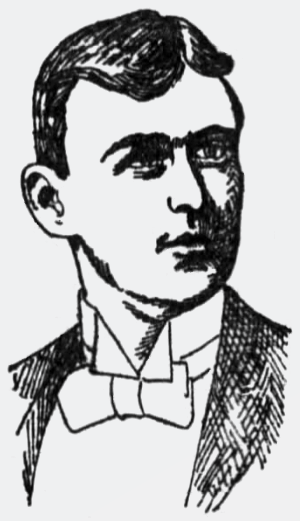
Jack Meara was one of six men to play the entire season.

A number of roster changes began on the team's May 19 off-day in a bid to move out of the cellar. Lookabaugh and Kinsler were released. Stallings reinforced the roster with the addition of outfielder Billy Work on May 21, pitcher Carney Flynn on May 22, shortstop Josh Reilly and right fielder Jackson on May 23, pitcher J. R. Meeker on May 24, catcher Pop Swett on May 25, and pitcher Sam Shaw on May 31. Amateurs Jackson and Meeker only played in one game each. Stallings, a superstitious manager, also purchased new uniforms in a different color in an attempt to reverse the Tigers' luck. The new uniforms were first worn in a May 22 doubleheader in which Stallings, playing at catcher in the first game, had his finger split open by a swung bat. He had to remove himself from the game and was replaced by John Foreith, a local player pulled from the grandstand. Nashville lost the first game but won the second when it was called due to darkness in the third inning. Vanderbilt catcher Frank Fletcher was put into the next two games. Collopy, never seeming to have fully recovered from his blow to the head, was released on May 31. At the end of the month, in seventh place at 13–23 (.361), Stallings instituted mandatory morning workouts with fines for any player not in attendance.

Pitcher George Harper was added from the Detroit Creams on June 1. Reilly was released on June 5, and Flynn followed on June 9. By mid June, the team had moved up to sixth place at 19–29 (.396) and was starting to look a winning ball club. Local patronage for road game descriptions, which had relocated to the Board of Trade building, was booming. The Nashville Banner supposed that the club had a good chance of winning the pennant or at least landing near the top of the standings at the season's end if they kept up the pace. With the season scheduled to close in late September, the Nashvilles had plenty of time to move up.

Unfortunately, just as it had in 1893, the Southern League was soon in danger of collapsing. The Macon Hornets, who had played poorly all season and suffered financially from ever-dwindling attendance, surrendered their franchise to the league on June 19. A rumor that the Atlanta Atlantas were next to drop out began circulating on June 23. President Nicklin called a meeting for June 26 in Montgomery to formulate a plan to keep the league going. It was confirmed on June 25 that Atlanta would be surrendered to the league and that Charleston would also jump. At the league meeting, it was decided to split the season into two series, the first ending on June 27 and the second beginning on June 29. The first-place Memphis Giants were awarded the first series pennant. Whichever team won the second series would play Memphis for the championship. The league was also reduced to four clubs: Atlanta, Nashville, New Orleans, and Memphis. In a complicated move, the Atlanta franchise folded, but the Mobile team was relocated there to continue the season.

Nashville's final game of the first series was a close 6–3 loss at New Orleans on June 27. Despite losing all three games in the series, the Tigers were improving and ended the first series in sixth place with a 24–34 (.414) record, 16 1/2 games behind Memphis.

==== The second series of 1894 ====
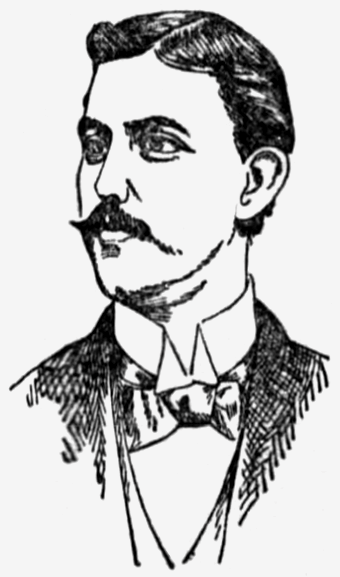
Charles Dooley went in with Stallings to finance the team.

The Nashvilles underwent a few changes in preparation for the start of the second series on June 29. Borchers was released. Ollie Beard, who had played for the Nashville Americans in 1885 and 1886, was acquired from the defunct Charleston team. The roster consisted of pitchers Harper, Moran, and Shaw; catcher Swett; first baseman Dooley; second baseman O'Brien; third baseman Whitehead; shortstop Beard; left fielder Sweeney; center fielder Stallings; and right fielders Meara and Work.

The Tigers and Memphis Giants arrived at Athletic Park in carriages led by a brass band. In the top of the first inning, O'Brien hit the first pitch over the outfield fence for a home run. Three more runs were scored in the home half of the first, but a Memphis run in the bottom half and three in the second inning tied the game at 4–4. The Giants scored five runs in the third, but the Tigers answered with six of their own in the fourth. The game was called due to rain in the middle of the sixth, with the Nashvilles winning the first game of the new series, 10–9, before 1,500 people. Work was released after the game. They very nearly made it two-in-a-row, but a costly four-run ninth inning on June 30, gave the locals an 8–7 loss. With a win over Memphis on July 2, the Tigers moved into a tie for first place with Atlanta, and then took sole possession of first with a win over the Atlantas on July 3. Nashville retained first place by splitting a July 4 doubleheader with Atlanta before a crowd of over 3,000. Shaw was released on July 6.

The Independence Day doubleheader was originally scheduled to be capped off by a night game, but was prevented by rain. This was long before ballparks were equipped with electric lights, and night games were seen only as gimmicks. To put time into perspective, the first major league night game was not played until over 40 years later in 1935. An attempt to play on July 5 was also rained out, but the spectacle was finally rescheduled for July 6 as a tripleheader against the New Orleans Pelicans. The first two games would be played during the afternoon, with the special night game to be played that evening at 8:30.

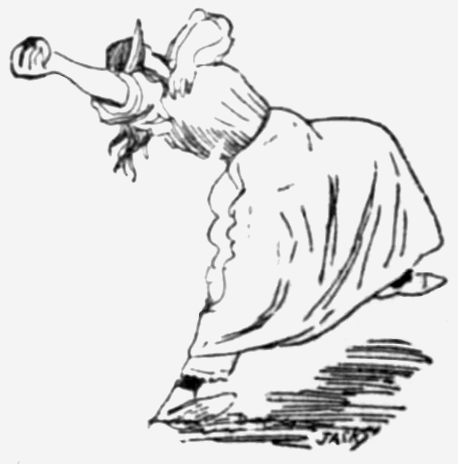
George Harper pitched in a dress, wig, and bonnet for the night game.

New Orleans won the first game and Nashville won the second, allowing the Tigers to remain in first place. The night game would be contested merely as an exhibition with all proceeds going to Nashville's players. The special program commenced with a fireworks display and was followed by a balancing act and slack-wire walking demonstration. Members of both teams competed in long-distance throwing and sliding competitions and a 100-yard (91 m) dash won by Meara. Fifty-four large electric lights were placed around Athletic Park to illuminate the field, and the baseball was covered with phosphorus to aid visibility. Adding to the novelty of a night game, players marched onto the field wearing burlesque costumes that included ballet outfits, loud suits, dresses, wigs, and bonnets. The estimated 4,000 fans in attendance were entertained by antics such as base runners leading fielders on a chase through dark regions of the outfield and climbing up a light pole to avoid being tagged out. Nashville won, 3–2. This marked the first time that a night baseball game was played in Nashville, a feat often incorrectly attributed to the Nashville Vols in 1931, though the Vols' game was a serious contest.

On July 7, Nashville ended the opening homestand with a 15–11 victory over the Pelicans. After the game, the team came to an abrupt end. Its demise, and eventually that of the Southern League, was caused when Memphis indicated it had no intention to play any more road games and the club sold two of its players to make up for recent financial losses, a violation of the league's rules. With the Nashvilles scheduled to play next in Memphis, rather than lay out the necessary capital for the three-city road trip with no guarantee that any of the clubs would return to play in Nashville, Stallings and Dooley paid their players' wages and disbanded. As of their final game, the Tigers were in first place with a 6–3 (.667) record, half a game ahead of Atlanta. Atlanta concluded its series at Memphis on July 8 with a win, thus tying for first with Nashville. New Orleans then traveled to Atlanta to close out the campaign by playing their final three scheduled games on July 10 and 11. Atlanta won all three, which moved them into first place and dropped the Tigers to second, 1 1/2 games back. Nashville's composite record for both series was 30–37 (.448).

Several of the Nashvilles signed on with other teams, including Harper who was acquired by the National League's Philadelphia Phillies. Some of the others stuck together to play two games on July 11 and 12 against a team from Clarksville. They had to pick up amateur players from the Nashville Athletic Club to make out a full lineup and lost both games. In 1895, the city was represented in the Southern League by the Nashville Seraphs.

== Season-by-season results ==
=== 1893 standings ===
1893 Southern League first series standings (April 20–July 4)
Team	Games	Won	Lost	Win %	Finish	GB
Augusta Electricians	61	44	17	.721	1st	—
Charleston Seagulls	61	43	18	.705	2nd	1
Savannah Electrics/Rabbits	62	38	24	.613	3rd	6 1/2
Atlanta Windjammers	63	38	25	.603	4th	7
Memphis Fever Germs	61	33	28	.541	5th	11
Macon Central City/Hornets	64	33	31	.516	6th	12 1/2
Chattanooga Warriors	64	32	32	.500	7th	13 1/2
Montgomery Colts	64	26	38	.406	8th	19 1/2
New Orleans Pelicans	63	25	38	.397	9th	20
Birmingham Grays/Blues	64	25	39	.391	10th	20 1/2
Mobile Blackbirds	63	20	43	.317	11th	25
Nashville Tigers	64	20	44	.313	12th	25 1/2

1893 Southern League second series standings (July 6–August 12)
Team	Games	Won	Lost	Win %	Finish	GB
Macon Central City/Hornets	28	21	7	.750	1st	—
Memphis Fever Germs	30	20	10	.667	2nd	2
Mobile Blackbirds	28	18	10	.643	3rd	3
Chattanooga Warriors	29	16	13	.552	4th	5 1/2
Atlanta Windjammers	31	17	14	.548	5th	5 1/2
New Orleans Pelicans	28	15	13	.536	6th	6
Savannah Electrics/Rabbits	29	15	14	.517	7th	6 1/2
Nashville Tigers	29	13	16	.448	8th	8 1/2
Montgomery Colts	31	12	19	.387	9th	10 1/2
Charleston Seagulls	22	8	14	.364	10th	10
Birmingham Grays/Blues/Pensacola	28	9	19	.321	11th	12
Augusta Electricians	29	7	22	.241	12th	14 1/2

=== 1894 standings ===
1894 Southern League first series standings (April 11–June 27)
Team	Games	Won	Lost	Win %	Finish	GB
Memphis Giants	57	40	17	.702	1st	—
Mobile Bluebirds	60	38	22	.633	2nd	3 1/2
Charleston Seagulls	55	32	23	.582	3rd	7
Savannah Modocs	54	28	26	.519	4th	10 1/2
New Orleans Pelicans	60	29	31	.483	5th	12 1/2
Nashville Tigers	58	24	34	.414	6th	16 1/2
Atlanta Atlantas	58	21	37	.362	7th	19 1/2
Macon Hornets	53	15	38	.283	8th	23

1894 Southern League second series standings (June 29–July 11)
Team	Games	Won	Lost	Win %	Finish	GB
Atlanta Atlantas	12	9	3	.750	1st	—
Nashville Tigers	9	6	3	.667	2nd	1 1/2
New Orleans Pelicans	12	4	8	.333	3rd	5
Memphis Giants	9	2	7	.222	4th	5 1/2

== Ballpark ==
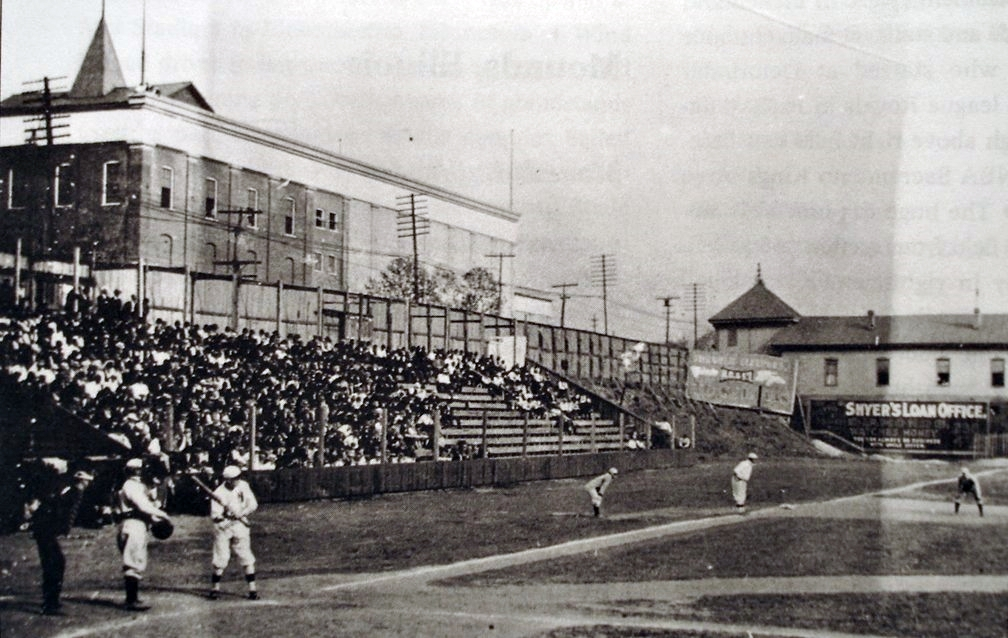
The Fourth Avenue bleachers as they appeared at Athletic Park in 1908

The Tigers played their home games at Nashville's Athletic Park. The first grandstand was built at the northeastern corner of the block bounded by modern-day Jackson Street, Fourth Avenue North, Harrison Street, and Fifth Avenue North to accommodate fans of the Nashville Americans in 1885. Located in Sulphur Springs Bottom, the land had hitherto been little more than solely a baseball field and required improvements to make it suitable for professional teams. The main Jackson Street entrance led past the ticket booth and into the grandstand's reserved seats behind home plate and a screen backstop. Rooms for players, directors, scorers, and reporters were built under the grandstand. Restrooms and water fountains, which pumped up sulphur water from the springs below, were also built. The distance to the outfield fence was 362 feet (110 m) to left and right fields and 485 feet (148 m) to center.

The grounds, though still utilized for amateur athletics, had not been used for professional sports since the Nashville Blues played in 1887. In preparation for the Tigers' 1893 season, additional seating was added to the west (first base) side of the grandstand and the fences were repaired. In early May, 200 chairs were placed in right field. A new press stand was erected later in the month.

Extensive renovations were made prior to the 1894 season, including the construction of a new fence and grandstand just west of the original. The existing grandstand was refurbished and given a coat of whitewash, and a screen was placed to block the setting sun. The total seating capacity was around 1,000, which consisted of about 500 opera chairs, some in private boxes near the front, and bleachers along Fourth Avenue. The diamond was leveled, and a new scoreboard was added in right field. The facility, known as Sulphur Dell from 1908, was demolished in 1969 after serving as the home of the Nashville Vols from 1901 to 1963. Since 2015, the site has been the location of First Horizon Park, the home stadium of the Triple-A Nashville Sounds baseball team.

== Uniforms ==
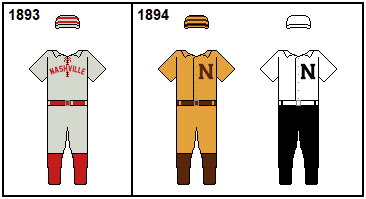
Nashville's uniforms

The Tigers' 1893 uniforms were described by The Daily American as "very neat and tasteful being gray with red trimmings, and having the name 'Nashville' across the breast in red letters." The newspaper also published a series illustrations depicting players in light shirts with "Nashville" arched across the chest, light pants, dark stockings and belts, and light caps with two dark horizontal stripes.

The Nashvilles wore different uniforms for the 1894 season described by The American as "consisting of a light golden-brown shirt and trousers, with seal-brown caps, belts, and stockings". Also mentioned were matching dark brown double-breasted coats with large pearl buttons. The paper also published an illustration showing players in light shirts with a dark "N" on the left chest, light pants, dark stockings and belts, and dark caps with two light horizontal stripes and a light edge on the brim. Starting on May 22, the team wore new uniforms of "black pants and stockings with white shirts and caps". Stallings had played on seven pennant-winning teams which had worn such a combination, and he hoped the change would reverse their recent string of bad luck.

== Players ==
A total of 69 men played in at least one game for Nashville across the 1893 and 1894 seasons. Of these, 40 also played for major league teams during their careers. The 1893 roster consisted of 43 different players, including 26 who also played in the majors at some point. The 1894 roster consisted of 26 different players, including 14 past or future major leaguers. No one played for both iterations of the club.

Table key
Position(s)	The player's primary fielding position(s)
MLB	Indicates that a player played in at least one game for a major league team

Positions key
P	Pitcher	SS	Shortstop
C	Catcher	LF	Left fielder
1B	First baseman	CF	Center fielder
2B	Second baseman	RF	Right fielder
3B	Third baseman	OF	Outfielder

=== The 1893 roster ===
1893 Nashville Tigers roster
Name	Position(s)	Notes	MLB	Ref(s).
King Bailey	P/OF	Joined on July 30; Played remainder of season	Yes	
Harry Berte	OF/SS	Joined on July 13; Left team on July 24	Yes	
Daniel Boland	C/LF	Joined on June 5; Played remainder of season	No	
Albert Boxendale	P	On Opening Day roster; Left team on June 1	No	
Joe Burke	3B	On Opening Day roster; Played entire season	Yes	
Josh Conley	1B	Joined on May 2; Released on May 6	No	
John Dolan	P	Joined from St. Louis Browns on July 7; Played only one game	Yes	
Newt Fisher	CF	Joined on July 6; Played only one game	Yes	
Bill Geiss	3B	On Opening Day roster; Left team on April 12	Yes	
Thomas Gillen	P	On Opening Day roster; Released on May 20	No	
Hanley	CF	Joined on August 10; Played only one game	No	
Paul Hines	CF	Joined on May 24; Released on May 28	Yes	
Bill Hoffer	P/OF	Joined on April 21; Played remainder of season	Yes	
Hughes	RF	Joined on July 4; Played only one game	No	
Jack Keenan	P/OF	Joined on June 7; Released on July 24	Yes	
Bill Krieg	RF	On Opening Day roster; Released on June 2	Yes	
Frank LaCourage	LF	Joined on July 29; Released on July 30	No	
Laird	CF	Joined on June 30; Played only one game	No	
Bob Langsford	SS	Joined on August 4; Played remainder of season	Yes	
Sam LaRocque	2B/SS	On Opening Day roster; Released on July 14	Yes	
Leiter	SS	Joined on June 14; Left team on June 29	No	
Tom Letcher	RF	Joined on June 5; Left team on June 16 (wife's illness)	Yes	
Con Lucid	P/OF	Joined on June 26; Released on July 17	Yes	
Reddy Mack	2B	On Opening Day roster; Released on May 28	Yes	
Mart McQuaid	SS	Joined on June 10; Left team on June 13	Yes	
Dusty Miller	CF	On Opening Day roster; Played entire season	Yes	
Charlie Newman	1B	Joined on June 27; Played remainder of season	Yes	
Billy O'Brien	1B	Joined on May 4; Left team on June 28 (injury)	Yes	
Tom O'Brien	1B	On Opening Day roster; Released on April 30	Yes	
Dick Phelan	2B	Joined on July 22; Left team on July 30	Yes	
Bill Phillips	P	On Opening Day roster; Left team on April 13	Yes	
Pat Ready	RF	Joined on June 30; Played only one game	No	
Smith	RF	Joined on July 6; Left team on August 8	No	
Sowders	CF	Joined on July 4; Played only one game	No	
Sullivan	LF/RF	Joined on August 10; Played remainder of season	No	
Ted Sullivan	RF/P	First played himself on June 20; Left team on July 26	Yes	
Kid Summers	C	On Opening Day roster; Left team on July 26	Yes	
Harry Truby	2B/SS	Joined on July 7; Played remainder of season	Yes	
Bully Turner	P	Joined on June 16; Played only one game	No	
Tom Vickery	P	On Opening Day roster; Released on June 3	Yes	
William Wetterer	SS	Joined on May 27; Left team on June 9 (bereavement of wife)	No	
DeLoss Wood	LF	On Opening Day roster; Released on June 2	No	
Billy York	CF	Joined on June 20; Played only one game	No	

=== The 1894 roster ===
1894 Nashville Tigers roster
Name	Position(s)	Notes	MLB	Ref(s).
Ollie Beard	SS	Joined on June 29; Played remainder of season	Yes	
George Borchers	P	On Opening Day roster; Released on June 28	Yes	
George Cleve	RF	On Opening Day roster; Released on April 28	No	
Jim Collopy	SS	On Opening Day roster; Released on May 31	No	
Charles Dooley	1B	On Opening Day roster; Played entire season	No	
Frank Fletcher	C	Joined on May 23; Released on May 24	No	
John Foreith	C	Joined on May 22; Played only one game	No	
Carney Flynn	P	Joined on May 22; Released on June 9	Yes	
George Harper	P	Joined on June 1; Played remainder of season	Yes	
Jackson	RF	Joined on May 23; Played only one game	No	
William Kinsler	C	Joined on May 10; Released on May 19	Yes	
Jacob Lookabaugh	P	On Opening Day roster; Released on May 19	No	
Jack Meara	LF	On Opening Day roster; Played entire season	No	
J. R. Meeker	P	Joined on May 24; Played only one game	No	
Sam Moran	P/CF	Joined on May 2; Played remainder of season	Yes	
John O'Brien	2B	On Opening Day roster; Played entire season	Yes	
Peralto	P	Joined on April 24; Released on May 14	No	
Abner Powell	CF	Joined on April 22; Released on May 15	Yes	
Josh Reilly	SS	Joined on May 23; Released on June 5	Yes	
Sam Shaw	P	Joined on May 31; Released on July 6	Yes	
George Stallings	CF/C	On Opening Day roster; Played entire season	Yes	
Pete Sweeney	OF/SS	On Opening Day roster; Played entire season	Yes	
Pop Swett	C	Joined on May 25; Played remainder of season	Yes	
Edward Webster	C/CF	On Opening Day roster; Released on April 28	No	
Milt Whitehead	3B	On Opening Day roster; Played entire season	Yes	
Billy Work	RF	Joined on May 21; Released on June 29	No	
