= Acid Iron Earths =

- 1886; Mobile, Alabama

Minor league affiliations
- Class: Independent (1886)
- League: Gulf League (1886)

Major league affiliations
- Team: None

Minor league titles
- League titles (1): 1886

Team data
- Name: Acid Iron Earths (1886)
- Ballpark: Frascati Park (1886)

The Acid Iron Earths were a minor league baseball team based in Mobile, Alabama. In 1886, the uniquely named "Acid Iron Earths" played as members of the independent Gulf League, winning the league championship in the league's only season of play. The team played home games at Frascati Park, which contained the first professional baseball park in Mobile. The "Acid Iron Earths" team name corresponds to the eras locally produced "Acid Iron Earth" medicinal tonic. The team was owned by Charles Mohr, who had a patent on iron tablets, whose local company manufactured the Acid Iron Earth tonic.

The Acid Iron Earths are believed to be the first professional team to travel to a foreign country, playing exhibition games in Cuba.

== History ==
The "Acid Iron Earths" played in the 1886 season, based in Mobile, Alabama. The unique "Acid Iron Earths" team name corresponds to medicine and tonic that was being locally produced in the era, coming from the so named "Acid Iron Earth" in Alabama. The team was owned by Charles Mohr, who had a patent on iron tablets and his company manufactured the tonic named "Acid Iron Earth." The Acid Iron Earth Company was founded in April, 1886. The team was known to be the first professional team to travel to another country, playing exhibition games in Cuba.

On April 7, 1886, the Gulf League finalized plans to play in the 1886 season. Teams were expected to be placed in Columbus, Georgia, Mobile, Alabama, Montgomery, Alabama, New Orleans, Louisiana, Pensacola, Florida and Selma, Alabama.

Ultimately, the league began play as a four–team league, based in two cities. The Acid Iron Earths and the Mobile team were both based in Mobile, Alabama and were the first minor league teams hosted in the city. The New Orleans team and the Robert E. Lee's team were based in New Orleans, Louisiana.

On June 16, 1886, the league officers were selected, with J.G. Brien, of the Robert E. Lees as the Gulf League president; Richard Sheridan of the Acid Iron Earths, vice president; Charles Shaffer of Mobile, treasurer; and F. McKeough, of New Orleans, secretary.

On March 17, 1886, it was reported in the New Orleans Times-Picayune newspaper that "Mr. Irving Brower, with A. J. Reach & Co., has succeeded in getting the order for the uniforms for the ‘Acid Iron Earth’ baseball club. The uniforms will be handsome suits of light brown flannel trimmed with red, and red stockings and red belts."

To begin the season, the Acid Iron Earths hosted the Robert E. Lee's on June 20 and 21, 1886. After the Acid Iron Earths began Gulf League play on June 20, 1886, the season schedule ended on Oct 31, 1886. In the final standings, the Acid Iron Earths were the 1886 Gulf League champions, playing the season under manager John Kelly. The team ended the season a (20–11) record, finishing 1.0 game ahead of the second place Mobile (19–12). They were followed by New Orleans (15–15) and the Robert E. Lee's (7–23) in the final Gulf League standings.

Acid Iron Earths players Ollie Beard, Ed Cartwright, Charlie Duffee, Ed Dundon, John Kelly, Al Schellhase and Jake Wells all played in the major leagues. Notably, Ed Dundon became the first deaf player in major league history.

In 1887, the Gulf League and the Acid Iron Earths team did not resume play. The Mobile Swamp Angels and New Orleans Pelicans teams began play as members of the 1887 Southern League.

== The ballpark ==
The Acid Iron Earths played home minor league games at Mobile's first professional ballpark, located within Frascati Park. The ballpark also hosted the Gulf League Mobile team in 1886 and the 1887 Mobile Swamp Angels. The entire park itself was destroyed in a severe storm on October 2, 1893, and the new Monroe Park was built at a new site to replace the ruined Frascati Park, which wasn't rebuilt. The "Frascati Park and Baseball Grounds" was listed in Mobile's city directories and ceased being listed in the directory in 1895. Today, with today's Monroe Park nearby, containing numerous attractions and a baseball park, the former Frascati Park site is home to the FSI rail service center, "Frascati Shops," which has an address of 1120 Paper Mill Road.

== Year–by–year record ==
Year	Record	Finish	Manager	Playoffs/Notes
1886	20–11	1st	John Kelly	League champions No playoffs held

== Notable alumni ==
- Ollie Beard (1886)
- Ed Cartwright (1886)
- Charlie Duffee (1886)
- Ed Dundon (1886)
- John Kelly (1886, MGR)
- Al Schellhase (1886)
- Jake Wells (1886)
- Acid Iron Earths players
