= Robert E. Lee's =

- 1886; New Orleans, Louisiana

Minor league affiliations
- Class: Independent (1886)
- League: Gulf League (1886)

Major league affiliations
- Team: None

Minor league titles
- League titles (0): None

Team data
- Name: Robert E, Lee's (1886)
- Ballpark: Crescent City Base Ball Park* (1886)

The Robert E. Lee's were a minor league baseball team based in New Orleans, Louisiana. In 1886, the uniquely named Robert E. Lee's played as members of the Gulf League in the league's only season of play, placing last in the four–team league.

== History ==
After beginning amateur play under the "Robert E. Lee's" name in 1864, a team of the same name played minor league baseball in the 1886 season, based in New Orleans, Louisiana. They joined a fellow New Orleans team in beginning minor league play that season.

On April 7, 1886, the Gulf League finalized plans to play in the 1886 season. Teams were expected to be placed in Columbus, Georgia, Mobile, Alabama, Montgomery, Alabama, New Orleans, Louisiana, Pensacola, Florida and Selma, Alabama. Ultimately, the Gulf League began play as a four–team league, based in two cities. The Acid Iron Earths and the Mobile team were both based in Mobile, Alabama. The New Orleans team and the uniquely named Robert E. Lee's team were based in New Orleans, Louisiana and were the first professional baseball teams in the city.

On June 16, 1886, the league officers were selected, with J.G. Brien, of the Robert E. Lee's as the Gulf League president; Richard Sheridan of the Acid Iron Earths, vice president; Charles Shaffer of Mobile, treasurer; and F. McKeough, of New Orleans, secretary.

To begin the season, the Robert E. Lee's played in Mobile against the Acid Iron Earths on June 20 and 21, 1886. After the Robert E. Lee's began Gulf League play on June 20, 1886, the season schedule ended on Oct 31, 1886. In the final standings, the Robert E. Lee's finished last in the 1886 Gulf League, playing the season under manager Conrad Leithman.

The Acid Iron Earths team ended the season in first place in the Gulf League, with a 20–11 record. They finished 1.0 game ahead of second place Mobile (19–12). The two were followed by New Orleans (15–15) and the Robert E. Lee's (7–23) in the final Gulf League standings.

Robert E. Lee's players Joe Dowie, Bill Geiss, George Mundinger, John Peltz, Mike Shea, Lev Shreve and Jimmy Woulfe all played major league baseball.

In 1887, the Gulf League and the Robert E. Lee's team did not return to play. The New Orleans Pelicans and Mobile Swamp Angels teams began play as members of the 1887 Southern League.

== The ballpark ==
The Robert E. Lee's home minor league ballpark is not directly referenced. The Crescent City Base Ball Park opened in 1886, corresponding with the play of the 1886 New Orleans team and the Robert E. Lee's team in Gulf League play. The ballpark was also called "Sportsman's Park" and hosted the 1887 New Orleans Pelicans.

== Year–by–year records ==
Year	Record	Finish	Manager	Playoffs/Notes
1886	7–23	4th	Conrad Leithman	No playoffs held

== Notable alumni ==
- Joe Dowie (1886)
- Bill Geiss (1886)
- George Mundinger (1886)
- John Peltz (1886)
- Robert Pender (1886)
- Mike Shea (1886)
- Lev Shreve (1886)
- Jimmy Woulfe (1886)

== See also ==
- Robert E. Lee's players

== External references ==
- New Orleans - Baseball Reference
