= Kinsler =

Kinsler is a surname. Notable people with the surname include:

- Ian Kinsler (born 1982), Israeli-American baseball player
- William Kinsler (1867–1963), American baseball player
