= Gulf League =

- Classification: Independent (1886)
- Sport: Minor League Baseball
- First season: 1886
- Folded: 1886
- Replaced by: Southern League
- President: J.G. Brien (1886)
- No. of teams: 4
- Country: United States of America
- Most titles: 1 Acid Iron Earths (1886)

The Gulf League was an independent American minor baseball league that played in the 1886 season. The four–team league franchises were based in Mobile, Alabama and New Orleans, Louisiana, with each city hosting two teams. The Acid Iron Earths won the league championship.

== History ==
On April 7, 1886, the "Gulf League" finalized plans to play in the 1886 season. Teams were to be placed in Columbus, Georgia, Mobile, Alabama, Montgomery, Alabama, New Orleans, Louisiana, Pensacola, Florida and Selma, Alabama, with play beginning on April 24, 1886.

Ultimately, the league formed as a four–team league, based in two cities. The Mobile team and the Acid Iron Earths team were both based in Mobile, Alabama. The New Orleans team and the Robert E. Lee's team were based in New Orleans, Louisiana.

On June 16, 1886, J.G. Brien, of the Robert E. Lee's was announced as the Gulf League president; Richard Sheridan of the Acid Iron Earths, vice president; Charles Shaffer of Mobile, treasurer; and F. McKeough, of New Orleans, secretary.

The "Acid Iron Earth" team was so named because medicine and tonic was being made from the so named "Acid Iron Earth" in Alabama. The Acid Iron Earth Company was founded in April, 1886. The team was also the first known professional team to travel to another country, playing exhibition games in Cuba.

The Gulf League began play on June 20, 1886, with the season ending on Oct 31, 1886.

In the final standings, the 1886 Gulf League champion was Acid Iron Earth. They finished with a (20–11) record, finishing 1.0 game ahead of 2nd place Mobile (19–12). They were followed by New Orleans (15–15) and the Robert E. Lees (7–23).

In 1887, the Gulf League did not resume play. The Mobile Swamp Angels and New Orleans Pelicans teams began play as members of the 1887 Southern League.

== Cities represented ==
- Mobile, Alabama: Acid Iron Earths (1886)
- Mobile, Alabama: Mobile (1886)
- New Orleans, Louisiana: New Orleans (1886)
- New Orleans, Louisiana: Robert E. Lee's (1886)

== Yearly standings ==
1886 Gulf League

Team standings	W	L	PCT	GB	Managers
Acid Iron Earths	20	11	.645	-	John Kelly
Mobile	19	12	.612	1	J.F. Petty
New Orleans	15	15	.500	5½	Rudolph Lion
Robert E. Lee's	7	23	.233	5½	Conrad Leithman

No Playoffs Scheduled.
