= Brisbine Park =

Former baseball park in Atlanta, Georgia

Brisbine Park (sometimes erroneously called Brisbane Park) was a baseball park in Atlanta, Georgia.

In 1892, George E. Hopple, an executive of the Atlanta Traction Company, revived the Atlanta Crackers minor league baseball club after a two-year absence. He acquired a block bounded by Crumley Street Southwest (north); Windsor Street Southwest (east); Glenn Street Southwest (south); and Ira Street Southwest (west). The seating areas and home plate were in the northwest corner of the block. This location was convenient to the traction company's trolley lines. Coincidentally, it was about six blocks west of the future site of Atlanta–Fulton County Stadium.

== Baseball ==
Brisbine Park diagram in 1899

The first tenants of the ballpark were the Atlanta Crackers of the Southern League during 1892–1893 and then again in 1896–1898.

Local universities Georgia Tech and Georgia leased the property and played both baseball and football here before developing their own facilities.

Long after these teams had moved on, the ballpark continued to be used by local high school and other amateur teams, into the 1930s.

== Football ==
Georgia vs Auburn at Brisbine Park on Thanksgiving Day, 1896

The venue was frequently used for college football.

One of the most infamous events in football history occurred here. During a game between Georgia and Virginia on October 30, 1897, Georgia player Richard Von Albade Gammon suffered a severe concussion during a scrimmage. He was taken to a hospital and died the next morning. Gammon's death nearly resulted in the state legislature outlawing football. Only a plea from Gammon's own mother persuaded the governor to veto the pending bill.

A few days before Thanksgiving 1903, when Georgia was due to play Auburn in their annual game, a fire broke out at Brisbine which destroyed the covered stands. Temporary bleachers were installed that week in order to allow the game to be played. Adding injury to injury, in the spring the temporary bleachers were somehow stolen from the ballpark. Those incidents spelled the end of major college sports at Brisbine. Georgia and Auburn relocated their annual game to other venues. Georgia Tech arranged to play their games at Piedmont Park while they were building a facility on their own campus, which evolved into what is now Bobby Dodd Stadium.

== Currently ==
The property was eventually sold to the city. It is currently a fenced-off vacant lot, immediately south of Rosa L. Burney Park.

== Other sources ==
- Peter Filichia, Professional Baseball Franchises, Facts on File, 1993.
- Benson, Michael (1989). Ballparks of North America: A Comprehensive Historical Reference to Baseball Grounds, Yards, and Stadiums, 1845 to Present. Jefferson, N.C.: McFarland. ISBN 0-89950-367-5.
- Lowry, Philip J. (1992). Green Cathedrals: The Ultimate Celebration of All 271 Major League and Negro League Ballparks Past and Present. Reading, Mass.: Addison-Wesley. ISBN 0-201-56777-6.
