= Columbus Babies/River Snipes =

- 1896; Columbus, Georgia

Minor league affiliations
- Previous classes: Class B
- Previous leagues: Southern League

Major league affiliations
- Previous teams: Unaffiliated

Team data
- Name: Columbus Babies; Columbus River Snipes

The Columbus Babies/River Snipes were a minor league baseball team from Columbus, Georgia, that played in the Class B Southern League in 1896. The team finished the season with a 35–60 (.368) record.
