= Ollie Smith (baseball) =

American baseball player (1865–1954)

- Outfielder
- Born: October 19, 1865; Mount Vernon, Ohio, U.S.
- Died: February 4, 1954 (aged 88); Torrance, California, U.S.
- Batted: Left Threw: Left

MLB debut
- July 11, 1894, for the Louisville Colonels

Last MLB appearance
- August 25, 1894, for the Louisville Colonels

MLB statistics
- Batting average: .299
- Home runs: 3
- RBI: 20
- Stats at Baseball Reference

Teams
- Louisville Colonels (1894)

Orlin Hudson Smith (October 19, 1865 – February 4, 1954) was an American Major League Baseball outfielder who played with the Louisville Colonels in 1894. His minor league career lasted through 1899.
