= John O'Brien (second baseman) =

Canadian baseball player (1866–1913)

- Second baseman
- Born: July 13, 1866; Saint John, New Brunswick, Canada
- Died: May 13, 1913 (aged 46); Lewiston, Maine, U.S.
- Batted: Left Threw: Right

MLB debut
- April 22, 1891, for the Brooklyn Grooms

Last MLB appearance
- October 7, 1899, for the Pittsburgh Pirates

MLB statistics
- Batting average: .254
- Home runs: 12
- Runs batted in: 229
- Stats at Baseball Reference

Teams
- Brooklyn Grooms (1891); Chicago Colts (1893); Louisville Colonels (1895–1896); Washington Senators (1896–1897); Baltimore Orioles (1899); Pittsburgh Pirates (1899)

John Joseph O'Brien (July 13, 1866 – May 13, 1913) was a Canadian professional baseball player. He played second base in Major League Baseball between 1891 and 1899. He also had a lengthy minor league career and was head baseball coach at Bates College in 1904.
