= George Mundinger =

American baseball player (1854–1910)

- Catcher
- Born: November 20, 1854; New Orleans, Louisiana
- Died: October 12, 1910 (aged 55); Covington, Louisiana
- Batted: Right Threw: Right

MLB debut
- May 9, 1884, for the Indianapolis Hoosiers

Last MLB appearance
- May 20, 1884, for the Indianapolis Hoosiers

MLB statistics
- Batting average: .250
- Home runs: 0
- Runs batted in: 3

Teams
- Indianapolis Hoosiers (1884)

George Mundinger (November 20, 1854 – October 12, 1910) was a Major League Baseball catcher for the 1884 Indianapolis Hoosiers. He played in the minors through 1887.
