= Joe Burke (infielder) =

American baseball player (1867–1940)

- Third Baseman
- Born: December 7, 1867; Nashville, Tennessee, U.S.
- Died: November 3, 1940 (aged 72); Cincinnati, Ohio, U.S.
- Batted: Unknown Threw: Unknown

MLB debut
- September 26, 1890, for the St. Louis Browns

Last MLB appearance
- July 23, 1891, for the Cincinnati Kelly's Killers

MLB statistics
- Batting average: .500
- Home runs: 0
- Runs batted in: 3
- Stats at Baseball Reference

Teams
- St. Louis Browns (1890); Cincinnati Kelly's Killers (1891)

Joseph Aloysius Burke (December 7, 1867 – November 3, 1940) was an American Major League Baseball infielder. He played professionally for the St. Louis Browns and the Cincinnati Kelly's Killers of the American Association in three games during the 1890 and 1891 baseball seasons.

== Biography ==
Burke was born in Nashville, Tennessee. He played his first professional game on September 26, 1890, with the St. Louis Browns. He remained active in the minor leagues through 1899.

Burke died on November 3, 1940, in Cincinnati and is interred at St. Joseph New Cemetery in Cincinnati.
