= Mart McQuaid =

American baseball player (1861–1928)

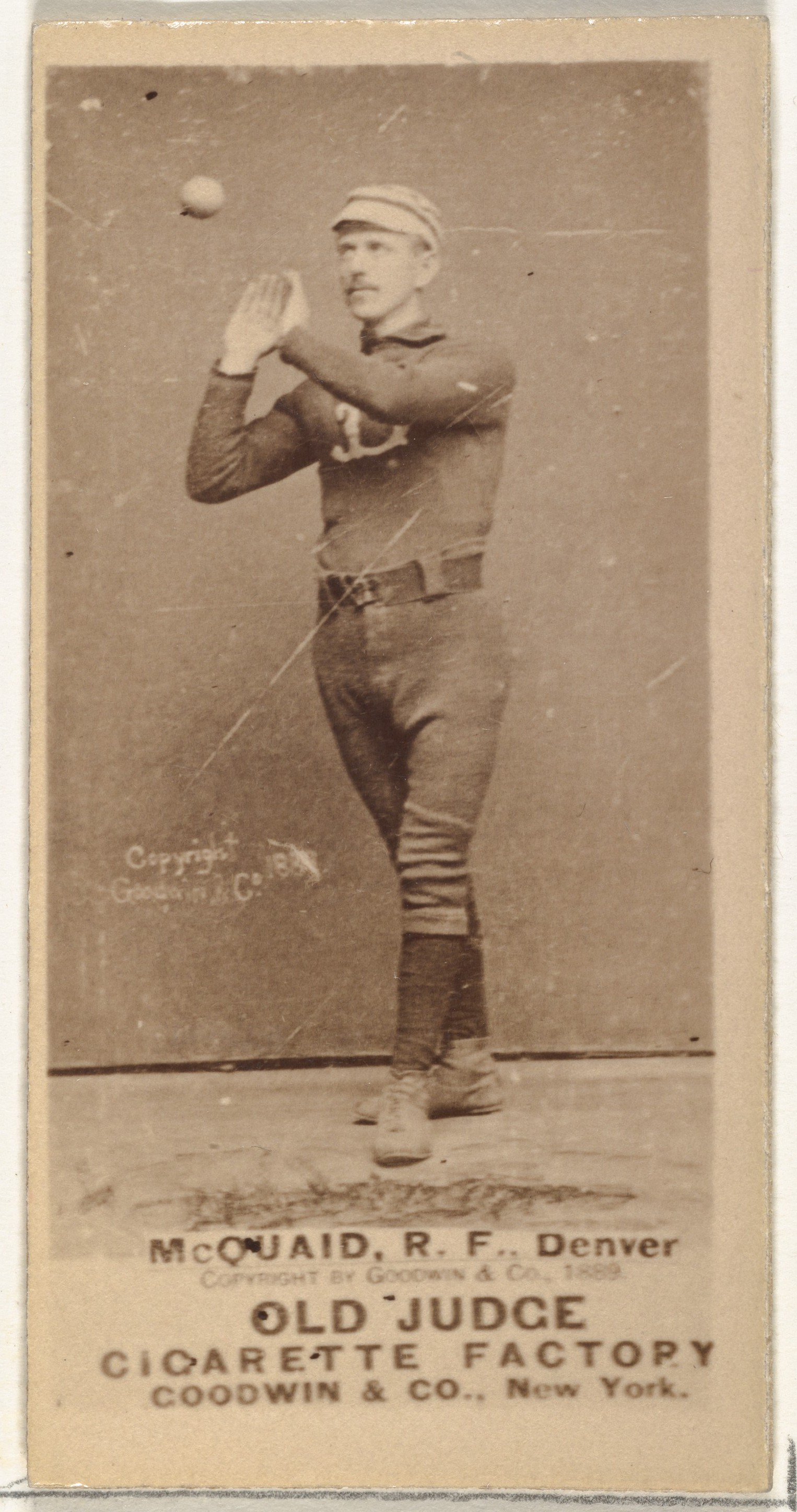
- Second baseman / Outfielder
- Born: June 28, 1861; Chicago, Illinois, U.S.
- Died: March 5, 1928 (aged 66); Chicago, Illinois, U.S.
- Batted: Unknown Threw: Unknown

MLB debut
- August 15, 1891, for the St. Louis Browns

Last MLB appearance
- August 25, 1898, for the Washington Senators

MLB statistics
- Batting average: .267
- Home runs: 0
- Runs batted in: 1
- Stats at Baseball Reference

Teams
- St. Louis Browns (1891); Washington Senators (1898)

Mortimer Martin McQuaid (June 28, 1861 – March 5, 1928) was an American professional baseball second baseman and outfielder in Major League Baseball for the 1891 St. Louis Browns and 1898 Washington Senators.
