= Columbus Stars (baseball) =

- 1885; Columbus, Georgia

Minor league affiliations
- Previous classes: Unclassified
- Previous leagues: Southern League

Major league affiliations
- Previous teams: Unaffiliated

Team data
- Name: Columbus Stars

The Columbus Stars were a minor league baseball team from Columbus, Georgia, that played in the Southern League in 1885. The team left the league two weeks before the scheduled end of the season with a 49–47 (.510) record.
