= William Kinsler =

American baseball player (1867–1963)

- Outfielder
- Born: November 9, 1867; New York City, New York, U.S.
- Died: August 10, 1963 (aged 95); Miami Beach, Florida, U.S.
- Batted: Unknown Threw: Unknown

MLB debut
- June 8, 1893, for the New York Giants

Last MLB appearance
- June 8, 1893, for the New York Giants

MLB statistics
- Batting average: .000
- Home runs: 0
- Runs batted in: 0
- Stats at Baseball Reference

Teams
- New York Giants (1893)

William H. Kinsler (November 9, 1867 – August 10, 1963) was an American professional baseball player who played outfield in the Major Leagues for New York Giants of the National League. He appeared in one game, on June 8, 1893. The following season he played for the Nashville Tigers in the Southern Association. At the time of his death, he was the oldest living former major league player.

Records
Preceded by Buster Burrell	Oldest recognized verified living baseball player May 8, 1962 – August 10, 1963	Succeeded by John Grimes
