= Kid Summers =

American baseball player (1868–1895)

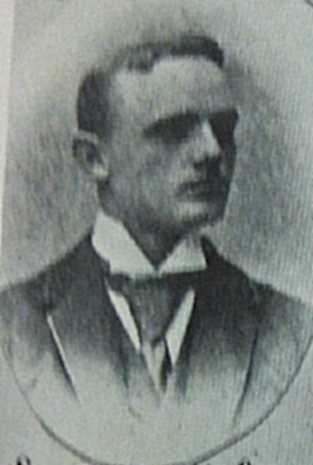
- Catcher / Outfielder
- Born: 1868; Toronto, Ontario, Canada
- Died: October 16, 1895 (aged 27); Toronto, Ontario, Canada
- Batted: Right Threw: Right

MLB debut
- August 5, 1893, for the St. Louis Browns

Last MLB appearance
- August 6, 1893, for the St. Louis Browns

MLB statistics
- Batting average: .000
- Home runs: 0
- Runs batted in: 0
- Stats at Baseball Reference

Teams
- St. Louis Browns (1893)

William "Kid" Summers (1868 – October 16, 1895) was a Canadian Major League Baseball player. He played for the St. Louis Browns in 1893.

== Sources ==
- Career statistics from Baseball Reference · Baseball Reference (Minors) · Retrosheet · Baseball Almanac
