= Evansville Blackbirds =

- 1895; Evansville, Indiana

Minor league affiliations
- Previous classes: Class B
- Previous leagues: Southern League

Major league affiliations
- Previous teams: Unaffiliated

Team data
- Name: Evansville Blackbirds

The Evansville Blackbirds were a minor league baseball team from Evansville, Indiana, that played in the Class B Southern League in 1895. The team finished the season in third place with a 66–38 (.635) record.
