= Ed Cartwright =

American baseball player (1859–1933)

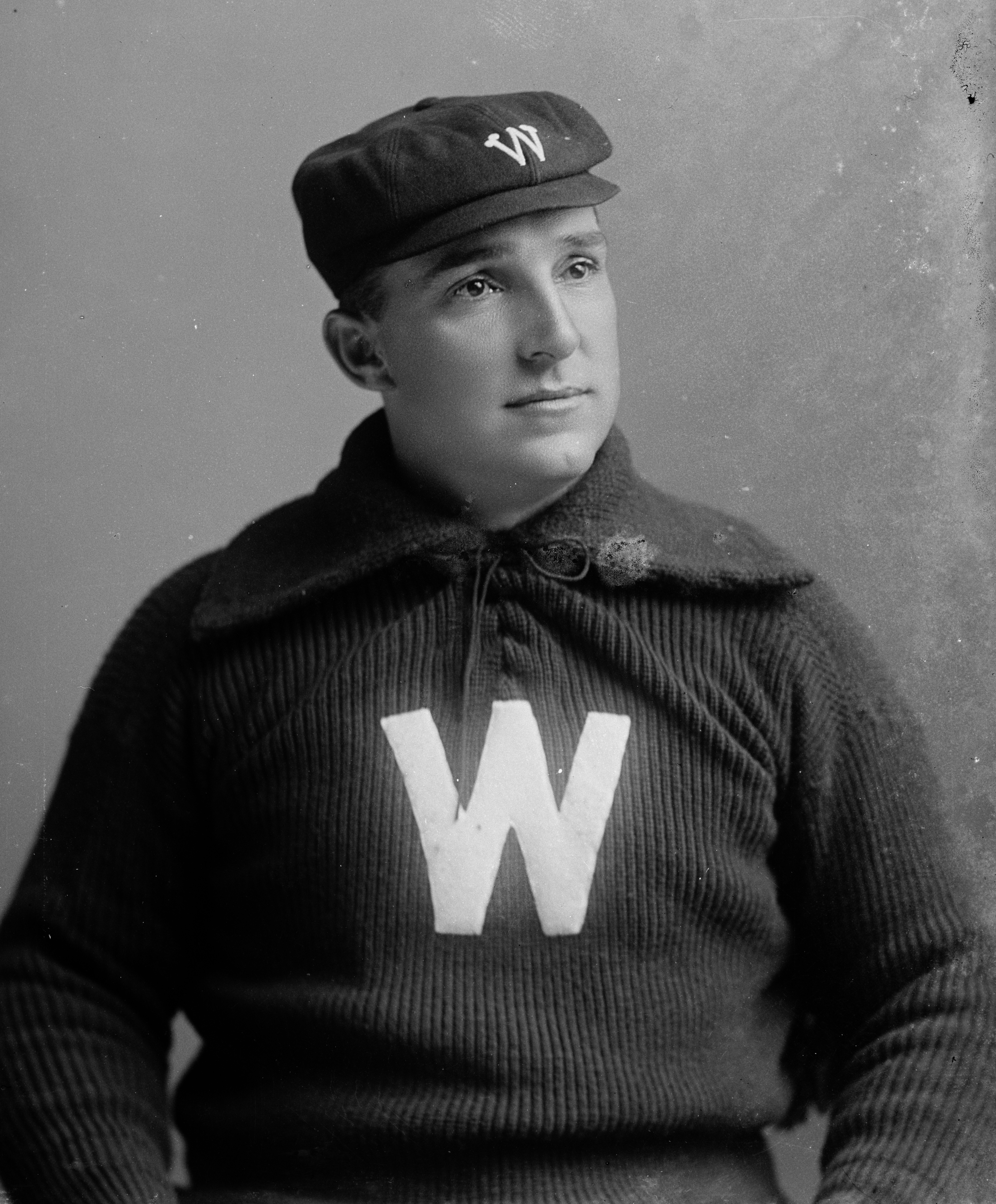
- Ed Cartwright photographed by C. M. Bell Studio
- First baseman
- Born: October 6, 1859; Johnstown, Pennsylvania, U.S.
- Died: September 3, 1933 (aged 73); St. Petersburg, Florida, U.S.
- Batted: Right Threw: Right

Major league debut
- July 10, 1890, for the St. Louis Browns

Last major league appearance
- June 4, 1897, for the Washington Senators

Major league statistics
- Batting average: .295
- On-base percentage: .368
- RBI: 333
- Stats at Baseball Reference

Teams
- St. Louis Browns (1890); Washington Senators (1894–1897)

Edward Charles "Jumbo" Cartwright (October 6, 1859 – September 3, 1933) was an American professional baseball first baseman who played in the major leagues in 1890 and from 1894 to 1897. He played for the St. Louis Browns of the American Association and the Washington Senators of the National League.

Cartwright is most famous for having seven RBIs in one inning, accomplished with the Browns on September 23, 1890; his record would stand for nearly 109 years until it was broken by Fernando Tatís of the St. Louis Cardinals on April 23, 1999. Cartwright also hit for the cycle on September 30, 1895, while playing for the Senators against the Boston Beaneaters.

== See also ==
- List of Major League Baseball players to hit for the cycle
