= Memphis Fever Germs =

- 1893; Memphis, Tennessee

Minor league affiliations
- Previous classes: Class B
- Previous leagues: Southern League

Major league affiliations
- Previous teams: Unaffiliated

Team data
- Name: Memphis Fever Germs

The Memphis Fever Germs were a minor league baseball team from Memphis, Tennessee, that played in the Class B Southern League in 1893.

The team was named after the Lower Mississippi Valley yellow fever epidemic of 1878, which hit Memphis hard—about 17,000 Memphians were sickened, over 5,000 died, and about 25,000 fled the stricken city.
