= Memphis Giants =

- 1892–1895; (1892, 1894–95); Memphis, Tennessee

Minor league affiliations
- Previous classes: Class B
- Previous leagues: Southern League

Major league affiliations
- Previous teams: Unaffiliated

Team data
- Name: Memphis Giants (1892, 1894–95); Memphis Lambs (1895)

The Memphis Giants were a minor league baseball team from Memphis, Tennessee, that played in the Class B Southern League in 1892, 1894, and 1895. The team was also known as the Memphis Lambs during part of the 1895 season. The 1894 team was awarded the Southern League pennant for having the best overall record.

== Season-by-season results ==
Year	Wins	Losses	Win %	GB	Finish
1892	46	76	.377	26.5	8th
1894	42	23	.646	—	1st
1895*	32	37	.464	—	7th

* In 1895, Memphis withdrew from the league before the completion of the season.
