= Atlanta Crackers =

- 1884–1965; (1884–1886, 1889, 1892–1898, 1902–1965); Atlanta, Georgia

Minor league affiliations
- Class: Class AAA (1962–1965); Class AA (1946–1961); Class A1 (1936–1945); Class A (1902–1935); Class B (1886, 1892–1896)
- League: International League (1962–1965); Southern Association (1902–1961); Southern League (1898); Southeastern League (1897); Southern Association (1892–1896); Southern League (1889); Southern Association (1886); Southern League (1885); Georgia State League (1884)

Major league affiliations
- Team: Milwaukee Braves (1965); Minnesota Twins (1964); St. Louis Cardinals (1962–1963); Los Angeles Dodgers (1960–1961); Boston/Milwaukee Braves (1950–1959)

Minor league titles
- Dixie Series titles (2): 1938; 1954
- League titles (7): 1935; 1938; 1946; 1954; 1956; 1957; 1962
- Pennants (21): 1885; 1886; 1895; 1907; 1909; 1913; 1917; 1919; 1925; 1935; 1936; 1938; 1941; 1944; 1945; 1946; 1950; 1954; 1956; 1957; 1960

Team data
- Name: Atlanta Crackers (1903–1965); Atlanta Colts (1898); Atlanta Crackers (1895–1897); Atlanta Atlantas (1894); Atlanta Windjammers (1893); Atlanta Firecrackers (1892); Atlanta (1889); Atlanta Atlantas (1885–1886); Atlanta (1884)
- Ballpark: Atlanta–Fulton County Stadium (1965); Ponce de Leon Park (1907–1964); Piedmont Park (1902–1906); Brisbine Park (1896–1898); Athletic Park (II) (1894–1895); Brisbine Park (1892–1893); Peters Park aka Athletic Park (I) (1885–mid-1886) and (1888–1889)

The Atlanta Crackers were a Minor League Baseball team based in Atlanta, Georgia, between 1901 and 1965. The Crackers were Atlanta's home team until the Atlanta Braves moved from Milwaukee, Wisconsin, in 1966.

== History ==
Atlanta played its inaugural Southern Association game, against the Nashville Baseball Club, on Saturday, April 26, 1902 (Memorial Day) in Piedmont Park before a crowd of around 3,500. For 60 years (until 1961), the Crackers were part of the Class AA Southern Association, a period during which they won more games than any other Association team, earning the nickname the "Yankees of the Minors". In 1962, the Association disbanded. Then, the former Miami Marlins, a Class AAA International League team that had spent 1961 playing in San Juan, Puerto Rico, and Charleston, West Virginia, moved to Atlanta and adopted the Crackers name, from "Georgia cracker" (which refers to early white settlers in Georgia) and "cracker," a pejorative term for poor rural White Southerners.

Originally the top affiliate of the St. Louis Cardinals, the AAA Crackers spent the 1964 season as the Minnesota Twins' top affiliate. Then, in 1965, the Milwaukee Braves became the Crackers' parent club. That team had bought the Crackers as part of their planned move to Atlanta in 1965; under MLB rules of the day, ownership of a minor league team also carried the major league rights to that city. However, an injunction forced the Braves to play a lame-duck season in Milwaukee. The Braves finally moved to Atlanta in 1966, and moved the Crackers to Richmond, Virginia, as the Richmond Braves. In a return home of sorts, the team moved to Gwinnett County, a northeastern suburb of Atlanta, in 2009 as the Gwinnett Braves, now the Gwinnett Stripers. Dating back to their time as the Crackers, the Stripers have been the Braves' top affiliate for 57 seasons, the longest-running affiliation agreement in Triple-A.

The Crackers won the Dixie Series, a postseason interleague championship between the champions of the Southern Association and the Texas League, in 1938 and 1954.

== Ballparks ==
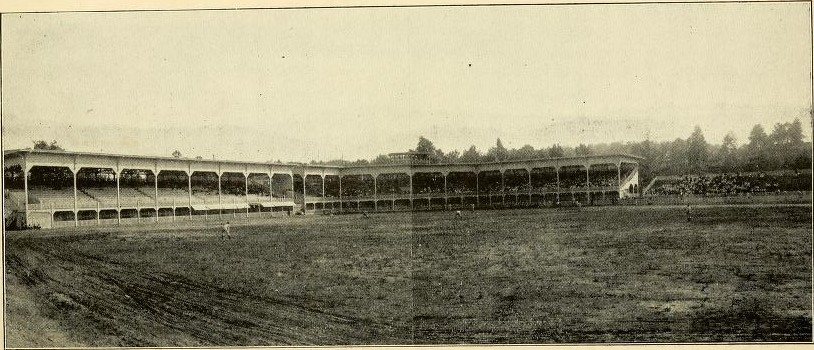
Ponce de Leon Park in 1907

The Crackers played in Ponce de Leon Park from 1907 until a fire on September 9, 1923, destroyed the all-wood stadium. Spiller Field (a stadium later also called Ponce de Leon Park), became their home starting in the 1924 season; it was named in honor of a wealthy businessman who paid for the new concrete-and-steel stadium. That new park was unusual because it was constructed around a magnolia tree that became part of center field. Balls landing in the tree remained in play, until Earl Mann took over the team in 1947 and had the outfield wall moved in about fifty feet. The Crackers played their last season in the newly built Atlanta Stadium (later known as Atlanta–Fulton County Stadium) in 1965.

== League affiliations ==
The Crackers were independent of major league farm systems until 1950. They then became a AA affiliate of the Boston/Milwaukee Braves (1950–1958) and Los Angeles Dodgers (1959–1961) during the last decade of the Southern Association's existence. As an International League team, they were the top affiliate of the St. Louis Cardinals (1962–63), Minnesota Twins (1964) and the Braves again (1965).

== Origin of the team's name ==
According to Tim Darnell, who wrote The Crackers: Early Days of Atlanta Baseball, the origins of the team name is unknown.

Darnell cites several possibilities as to why this name was chosen:

- A term that means a poor, white southerner
- Someone who is quick and efficient at a task
- In reference to plowboys who cracked the whip over animals, as in Georgia cracker
- A shortened version of "Atlanta Firecrackers", the earlier 1892 minor league team

During the period of Reconstruction following the American Civil War, there was also a political party of the same name. Organized in Augusta, Georgia, this party's platform was one of "opposition to Catholics and segregation of blacks".

While now sometimes used as a derogatory term for a white southerner that promotes racism, it is also used as a term of pride by some white southerners to indicate one that is descended from those original settlers of the area.

As in several other cities, Atlanta's local Negro league team was named after the local White league team: the Atlanta Black Crackers joined the Negro Southern League in 1920, and existed until the early 1950s.

== Notable players ==
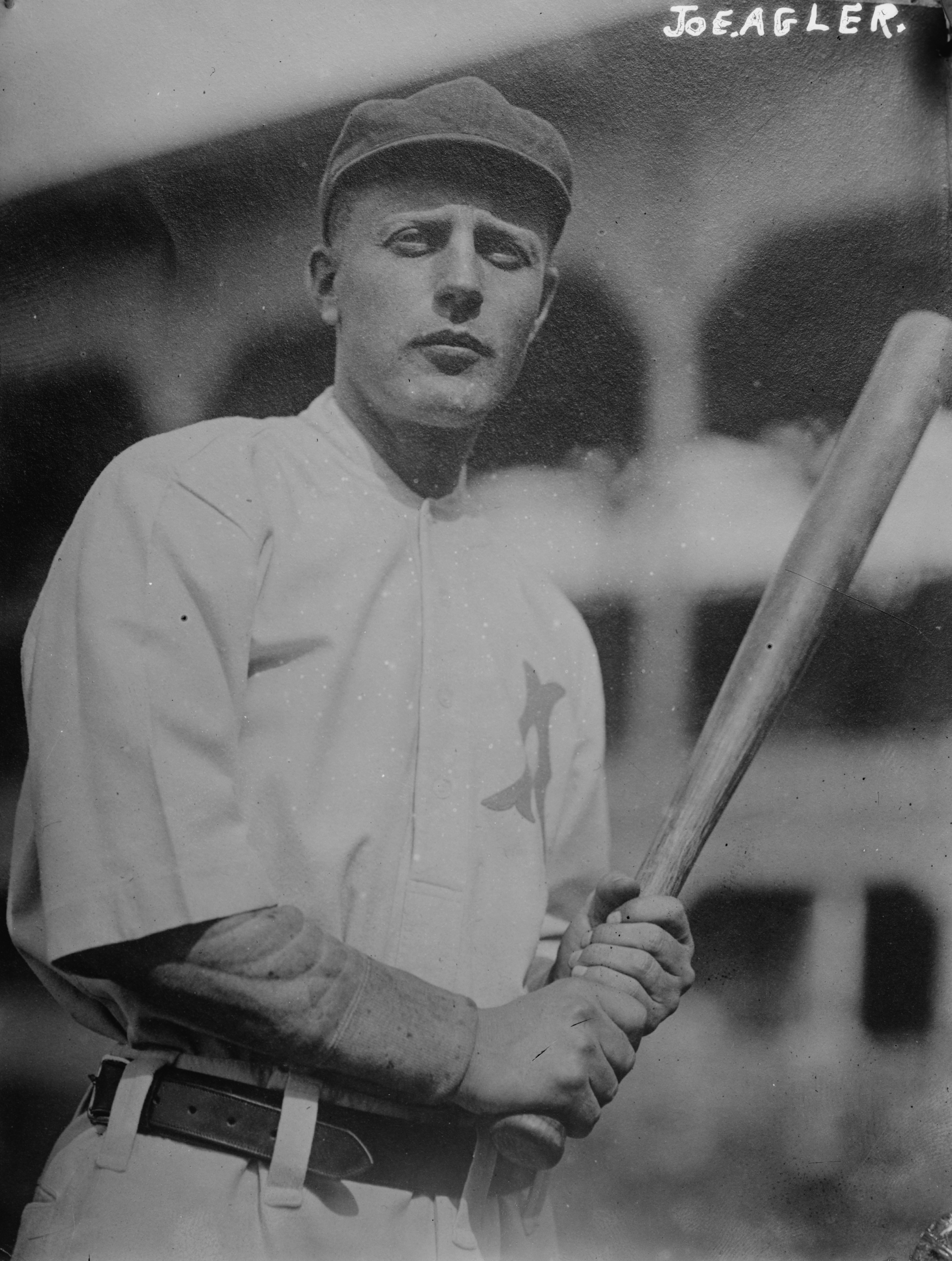
Joe Agler in uniform for the Atlanta Crackers in 1912

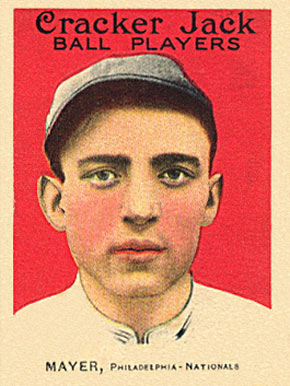
Erskine Mayer

- Luke Appling, a member of the Baseball Hall of Fame who later played for the Chicago White Sox. An Atlanta Braves coach in 1981 and again in 1984.
- Bruce Barmes, multiple All-Star and League Champion in minor leagues; uncle of San Diego Padres shortstop Clint Barmes
- Lou Castro
- Leo Cristante, a pitcher who went on to play for the Detroit Tigers and manage baseball teams in both Mexico and Montreal.
- Dick Donovan, pitched for the Crackers in the 1953 and 1954 seasons.
- Art Fowler, longtime major league pitcher and pitching coach.
- Lloyd Gearhart, who later played with the New York Giants.
- Billy Goodman (1944, 1946), a lifetime major league .300 hitter who won the 1950 American League batting title.
- Dutch Jordan
- Eddie Mathews, an inaugural Atlanta Braves player in 1966 and member of the Baseball Hall of Fame. Also Atlanta Braves Manager 1972–1974.
- Erskine Mayer, starting pitcher
- Tim McCarver, who went on to become a catcher for the St. Louis Cardinals.
- Ollie O'Mara, shortstop for the Brooklyn Robins and one-time oldest living Brooklyn Dodger.
- Nat Peeples, the only African-American player in the Southern Association (1954).
- Paul Richards, a catcher and later catcher-manager with the Crackers in the 1930s
- Jim Rivera (1921–2017), Major League Baseball player
- Chuck Tanner, better known as the manager of four different major league teams during the 1970s and 1980s, including the Atlanta Braves from 1986–1988.
- Charley Trippi, former member of the NFL's Chicago Cardinals and a member of the Pro Football Hall of Fame played one season in 1947.

Play-by-play announcer Ernie Harwell called Cracker games on the radio from 1943 to 1949 before being traded to Brooklyn Dodgers for catcher Cliff Dapper, the only time an announcer has been traded for a player.
