= Mobile Bears =

- 1886–1970; (1886–1887, 1889, 1892–1896, 1898–1899, 1903, 1905–1932, 1937–1942, 1944–1961, 1966, 1970); Mobile, Alabama

Minor league affiliations
- Class: Class AA (1946–1961, 1966, 1970); Class A1 (1944–1945); Class B (1932, 1937–1942); Class A (1908–1931); Class D (1905–1907); Class C (1899); Class B (1892–1896, 1898)
- League: Southern League (1966, 1970); Southern Association (1944–1961); Southeastern League (1932, 1937–1942); Southern Association (1908–1931); Cotton States League (1905–1907); Interstate League (1903); Southern League (1887, 1889, 1892–1896, 1898–1899); Gulf League (1886)

Major league affiliations
- Team: Chicago White Sox (1970); Kansas City Athletics (1966); New York Mets (1961); Cleveland Indians (1956–1960); Brooklyn Dodgers (1945–1955); St. Louis Cardinals (1932, 1937–1942)

Minor league titles
- Dixie Series titles (2): 1922; 1955
- League titles (10): 1906; 1907; 1937; 1938; 1941; 1945; 1947; 1955; 1959; 1966
- Pennants (3): 1899; 1922; 1947

Team data
- Name: Mobile White Sox (1970); Mobile A's (1966); Mobile Bears (1944–1961); Mobile Shippers (1937–1942); Mobile Red Warriors (1932); Mobile Marines (1931); Mobile Bears (1918–1930); Mobile Sea Gulls (1905–1917); Mobile Baseball Club (1903); Mobile Blackbirds (1896–1899); Mobile Bluebirds (1894–1895); Mobile Blackbirds (1892–1893); Mobile Baseball Club (1889); Mobile Swamp Angels (1887); Mobile Baseball Club (1886)
- Ballpark: Hartwell Field (1966, 1970); League Park (1918–1961)

The Mobile Bears were an American minor league baseball team based in Mobile, Alabama. The franchise was a member of the old Southern Association, a high-level circuit that folded after the 1961 season. Mobile joined the SA in 1908 as the Sea Gulls, but changed its name to the Bears in 1918, and the nickname stuck. The club played in the Association until July 1931, when it moved to Knoxville, Tennessee. Almost exactly 13 years later, in July 1944, the Bears returned to Mobile when the Knoxville Smokies franchise shifted back from Tennessee. (A club known as the Mobile Shippers competed in the Class B Southeastern League from 1937 to 1942.)

The Bears then continued in the SA (classified as a Double-A league in 1946) through its final season. During the 1940s and 1950s, the club was a longtime farm system affiliate of the Brooklyn Dodgers, then the Cleveland Indians. The Bears played in 5,000-seat Hartwell Field located on Virginia Street in midtown.

The nickname "Bears" lived on in modified form with the Mobile BayBears of the Double-A Southern League, who played 23 seasons (1997–2019) in Mobile before relocating to metropolitan Huntsville, Alabama.

The Bears won the Dixie Series, a postseason interleague championship between the champions of the Southern Association and the Texas League, in 1922 and 1955.
