= Southern League (1885–1899) =

Minor league baseball league active from 1885 to 1899

- Sport: Baseball
- Founded: 1885
- Folded: 1899
- Country: United States
- Most titles: New Orleans Pelicans (3)

The Southern League was a low-level minor baseball league which operated intermittently in the Southern United States from 1885 to 1899. Financial problems plagued the league and its member teams throughout their existence. It was not unusual for teams to depart the league during the season or for the league to cease operations without completing the season. It was this lack of financial support which ultimately caused the league to permanently disband in 1899. In 1901, a new league, called the Southern Association, was created from its remnants.

== History ==
The original Southern League was formed on February 11, 1885, in Atlanta. It was the first professional league to operate in the South. Henry W. Grady, managing editor of The Atlanta Journal-Constitution, was selected as the league's first president. The eight-team circuit included the Atlanta Atlantas, Augusta Browns, Chattanooga Lookouts, Columbus Stars, Memphis Reds, Nashville Americans, and unnamed teams from Birmingham, Alabama, and Macon, Georgia. Each team was scheduled to play 100 games during the season, but few would reach that mark as the Birmingham, Chattanooga, and Columbus clubs quit the league in the final two weeks of the season. Atlanta captured the Southern League's first pennant with their 66–32 (.673) season record. Nashville's Len Sowders was the league's first batting champion with a .309 batting average.

Financial insolvency, a perpetual problem in the league, forced the teams from Augusta and Chattanooga to drop out of the league in July 1886. Atlanta repeated their previous winning season by capturing the 1886 league pennant with a 64–28 (.696) record. Lefty Marr, mirroring Nashville teammate Len Sowders' feat from the previous season, was the league's batting champion with a .327 batting average. Charleston Seagulls pitcher Gus Wehling had the lowest earned run average (0.78) for the season. A new entrant to the league, the New Orleans Pelicans, won the 1887 league pennant with a 74–40 (.649) record. Of the seven teams fielded during the 1887 season, only three (Charleston, Memphis, and New Orleans) made it to the end of the season on October 11; financial problems forced the others to drop out of the league. Wally Andrews of Memphis was the league's batting champion (.413).

Only four teams were able to compete during the 1888 season. The season opened on April 7, was halted by early July. The league champion Birmingham Maroons compiled a 32–19 .(627) season. Memphis' John Sneed led the league with his .354 batting average. The league played again in 1889 but only fielded four teams, which was partially to blame for the failure of the 1888 season. After the first week or two of play, the Southern League reorganized by adding three other teams. The league collapsed again that season after only three teams remained active by the middle of the season. New Orleans (46–9, .836) was in first place at the time the league dissolved. The circuit was non-operational from 1890 to 1891.

The Southern League started up again in 1892, and the Birmingham Grays (73–50, .593) won the league pennant. The 1893 Southern League featured the largest circuit in the league's history. The 12-team league was hampered by a poorly-designed schedule and insufficient financing which forced the owners of the Birmingham club, Charleston Seagulls, and Nashville Tigers to turn control of their teams over to the league, which continued to operate the clubs. A meeting was held on July 1, at which the league's president, Hart, resigned despite those in attendance asking him to reconsider. J.B. Nicklin of Chattanooga was elected as the new league president six days later. Between mid July and early August, The Birmingham team transferred to Pensacola, Florida, but soon found themselves quarantined from the rest of the league due to an outbreak of yellow fever. This development, in addition to ongoing financial debacles, caused the league to end the season on August 12. The Augusta Electricians were awarded the pennant for the first part of the season, and the Macon Central City/Hornets were awarded the pennant for the second half. Charlie Frank of Memphis won the league batting title with a .390 average.

In 1894, some teams were forced to sell their players to other clubs in order to stay financially solvent, while others refused to continue play in the second half. Only Nashville, Mobile, New Orleans, and Memphis competed after the season's midpoint. This prompted the Southern League to call the rest of the season off nine games into the second half on July 7, 1894, as the result of league-wide financial instability brought on by the expense of travel and poor attendance. Memphis was awarded the pennant for having the best overall record.

In the ensuing months, baseball leaders across the South considered which cities to include in the next iteration of the league. Representatives met at The Read House Hotel in Chattanooga on January 14 to reorganize for the 1895 season. Membership was granted to clubs in Atlanta, Chattanooga, Evansville, Little Rock, Memphis, Montgomery, Nashville, and New Orleans, thus lessening the expense of travel incurred in the past with the inclusion of cities such as Charleston and Savannah. Each of the eight teams paid a US$1,000 deposit to guarantee they would play the entire season. They also pledged to pay dues of $100 per month plus 3% of total gate receipts for a sinking fund. Player salaries were capped at $1,000 per team.

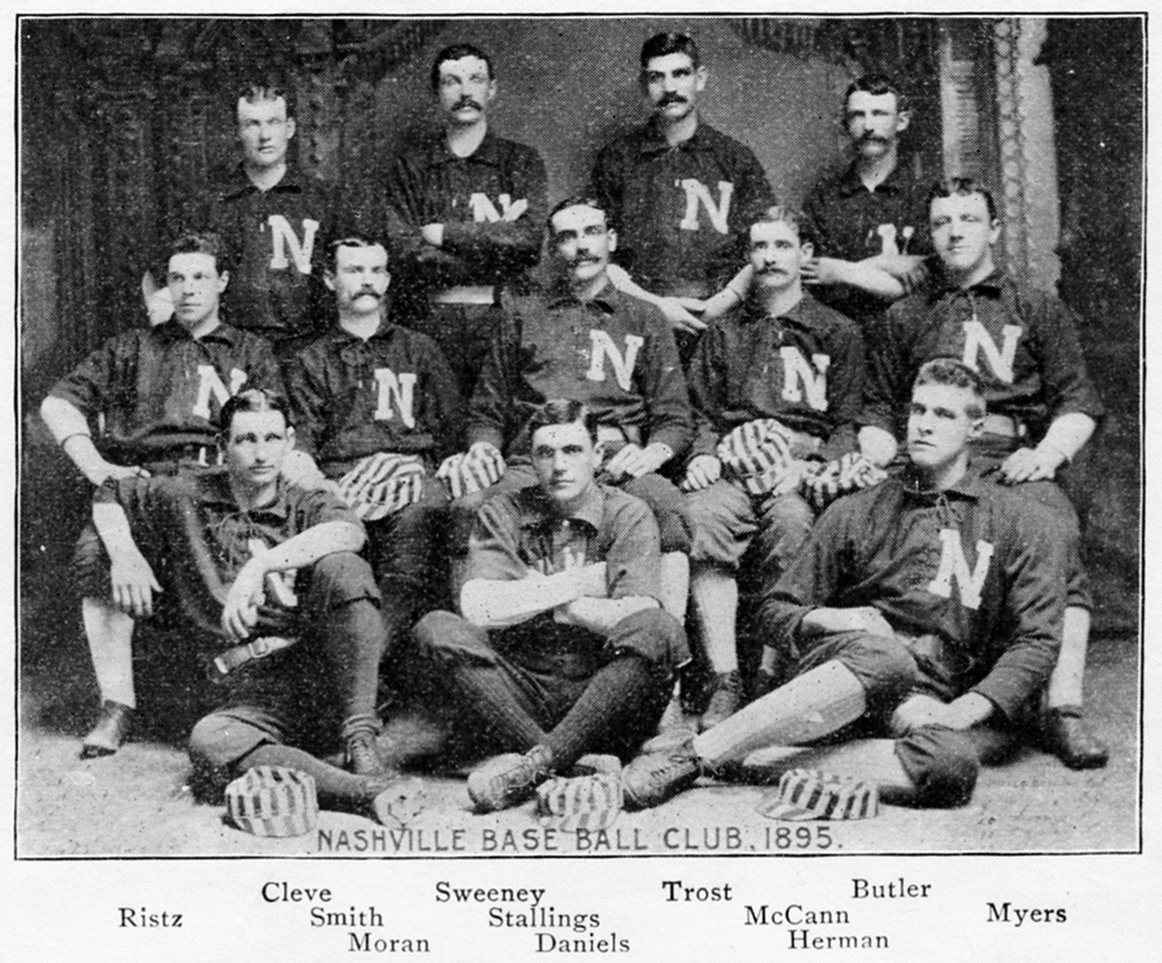
The 1895 champion Nashville Seraphs

The 1895 season saw the Chattanooga franchise being transferred to Mobile on June 19, Memphis disbanding on July 23, and Little Rock dropping out on July 27. Though the Atlanta Crackers and Nashville Seraphs ended the 1895 season tied for first place, a meeting of the league's directors resulted in the nullification of an August 10 game between the two in which the umpire improperly made an out call following fan interference. This ruling caused the Seraphs' winning percentage to rise to .676 (71–34) and Atlanta's to fall to .667 (68–34), making Nashville the pennant winner. Chattanooga/Mobile's Lew Whistler won the league batting title with a .404 batting average.

The New Orleans Pelicans (67–30, .744) won their third league pennant in 1896, giving them more championships in the original Southern League than any other club. The league was in-operational in 1897 due to the lack of financial support. In 1898, the league made it as far as July 4 before shutting down again. The Augusta, Georgia, club was in first place at the time with a 20–8 (.714) record. The Southern League consisted of only four teams during its 1899 season. The Mobile Blackbirds (23–16, .590) were in first place when the league suspended operations on May 1. This was the final season of competition for the original Southern League—a lack of interest and financial support caused the league to fold for good. Two years later, in 1901, the Southern Association was created by Abner Powell, Charley Frank, and Ike Fisher out of the remnants of the Southern League.

== Teams ==
Team nicknames were not official for most teams in the 19th century. Names were often bestowed by local sportswriters or civic leaders. As such, some records only provide the city a team represented with no moniker.

- Atlanta (1889)^{a}
- Atlanta Atlantas (1885–86, 1894)^{d}
- Atlanta Colts (1898)
- Atlanta Crackers (1895–96)
- Atlanta Firecrackers (1892)
- Atlanta Windjammers (1893)
- Augusta (1898)
- Augusta Browns (1885–86)
- Augusta Electricians (1893)
- Birmingham (1885, 1889, 1893)^{b} ^{c}
- Birmingham Barons (1896)
- Birmingham Grays (1892)
- Birmingham Ironmakers (1887)
- Birmingham Maroons (1888)
- Birmingham Reds (1898)
- Charleston (1889)^{a}
- Charleston Seagulls (1886–88, 1893–94, 1898)
- Chattanooga (1889)
- Chattanooga Chatts (1892)
- Chattanooga Lookouts (1885–86)
- Chattanooga Warriors (1893, 1895)^{e}
- Columbus Babies (1896)^{g}
- Columbus River Snipes (1896)^{g}
- Columbus Stars (1885)
- Dallas Steers (1899)^{h}
- Evansville Blackbirds (1895)
- Little Rock Travelers (1895)
- Macon (1885–86)
- Macon Central City (1892–1893)
- Macon Hornets (1893–1894)
- Memphis (1889)
- Memphis Browns (1887)
- Memphis Fever Germs (1893)
- Memphis Giants (1892, 1894–1895)^{f}
- Memphis Grays (1886, 1888)
- Memphis Lambs (1895)^{f}
- Memphis Reds (1885)
- Mobile (1889)^{b}
- Mobile Blackbirds (1892–1993, 1896, 1898–1899)
- Mobile Bluebirds (1894–1895)^{d} ^{e}
- Mobile Swamp Angels (1887)
- Montgomery Colts (1893, 1896)
- Montgomery Grays (1895)
- Montgomery Lambs (1892)
- Montgomery Senators (1898–1899)^{h}
- Nashville Americans (1885–1886)
- Nashville Blues (1887)
- Nashville Seraphs (1895)
- Nashville Tigers (1893–1894)
- New Orleans Pelicans (1887–1889, 1892–1896, 1898–1899)
- Pensacola (1893)^{c}
- Savannah (1886–1887, 1898)
- Savannah Electrics (1893)
- Savannah Modocs (1894)
- Shreveport Tigers (1899)

Notes

- ^{a} In 1889, Atlanta and Charleston were the same team.
- ^{b} In 1889, Birmingham and Mobile were the same team.
- ^{c} In 1893, Birmingham and Pensacola were the same team.
- ^{d} In 1894, the Mobile Bluebirds and Atlanta Atlantas were the same team.
- ^{e} In 1895, the Chattanooga Warriors and Mobile Bluebirds were the same team.
- ^{f} In 1895, Memphis's team was called both the Giants and the Lambs.
- ^{g} In 1896, the Columbus Babies and Columbus River Snipes were the same team.
- ^{h} In 1899, the Montgomery Senators and Dallas Steers were the same team.

=== City timeline ===
- Atlanta
  - Atlanta Atlantas (1885–1886) → Atlanta (1889) → Atlanta Firecrackers (1892) → Atlanta Windjammers (1893) → Atlanta Atlantas (1894) → Atlanta Crackers (1895–1896) → Atlanta Colts (1898)
- Augusta, Georgia
  - Augusta Browns (1885–1886) → Augusta Electricians (1893) → Augusta (1898)
- Birmingham, Alabama
  - Birmingham (1885) → Birmingham Ironmakers (1887) → Birmingham Maroons (1888) → Birmingham (1889) → Birmingham Grays (1892) → Birmingham (1893) → Birmingham Barons (1896) → Birmingham Reds (1898)
- Charleston, South Carolina
  - Charleston Seagulls (1886–1888) → Charleston (1889) → Charleston Seagulls (1893–1894, 1898)
- Chattanooga, Tennessee
  - Chattanooga Lookouts (1885–1886) → Chattanooga (1889) → Chattanooga Chatts (1892) Chattanooga Warriors (1893, 1895)
- Columbus, Georgia
  - Columbus Stars (1885) → Columbus Babies/River Snipes (1896)
- Dallas, Texas
  - Dallas Steers (1899)
- Evansville, Indiana
  - Evansville Blackbirds (1895)
- Little Rock, Arkansas
  - Little Rock Travelers (1895)
- Macon, Georgia
  - Macon (1885–1886) → Macon Central City (1892–1893) → Macon Hornets (1893–1894)
- Memphis, Tennessee
  - Memphis Reds (1885) → Memphis Grays (1886) → Memphis Browns (1887) → Memphis Grays (1888) → Memphis (1889) → Memphis Giants (1892) → Memphis Fever Germs (1893) → Memphis Giants (1894) → Memphis Lambs/Giants (1895)
- Mobile, Alabama
  - Mobile Swamp Angels (1887) → Mobile Blackbirds (1892–1893) → Mobile Bluebirds (1894–95) → Mobile Blackbirds (1896, 1898–1899)
- Montgomery, Alabama
  - Montgomery Lambs (1892) → Montgomery Colts (1893) → Montgomery Grays (1895) → Montgomery Colts (1896) → Montgomery Senators (1898–1899)
- Nashville, Tennessee
  - Nashville Americans (1885–1886) → Nashville Blues (1887) → Nashville Tigers (1893–1894) → Nashville Seraphs (1895)
- New Orleans, Louisiana
  - New Orleans Pelicans (1887–1889, 1892–1896, 1898–1899)
- Pensacola, Florida
  - Pensacola (1893)
- Savannah, Georgia
  - Savannah (1886–1887) → Savannah Electrics (1893) → Savannah Modocs (1894) → Savannah (1898)
- Shreveport, Louisiana
  - Shreveport Tigers (1899)

== League champions ==
- 1885: Atlanta Atlantas
- 1886: Atlanta Atlantas
- 1887: New Orleans Pelicans
- 1888: Birmingham Maroons
- 1889: New Orleans Pelicans
- 1890: non-operational
- 1891: non-operational
- 1892: Birmingham Grays
- 1893: Augusta Electricians (1st half) / Macon Central City/Hornets (2nd half)
- 1894: Memphis Grays
- 1895: Nashville Seraphs
- 1896: New Orleans Pelicans
- 1897: non-operational
- 1898: Augusta
- 1899: Mobile Blackbirds
