= 1887 Southern League season =

- League: Southern League
- Sport: Baseball
- Duration: April 16 – October 10
- Games: 120
- Teams: 7

Regular season
- League champions: New Orleans Pelicans

SL seasons
- ← 1886 1888 →

The 1887 Southern League was a minor league baseball season played between April 16 and October 10. Seven teams played a 120-game schedule, with the top team winning the league pennant and championship.

The New Orleans Pelicans won the Southern League championship, as they had the best record in the league.

== Team changes ==
- The Augusta Browns and the Chattanooga Lookouts did not return to the league after disbanding during the 1886 season.
- The Atlanta Atlantas and the Macon club disbanded.
- The Memphis Grays are renamed to the Memphis Browns.
- The Mobile Swamp Angels and New Orleans Pelicans join the league.
- The Nashville Americans are renamed to the Nashville Blues.
- The Birmingham Ironmakers join the league on June 1st.

== Teams ==
1887 Southern League
Team	City	Stadium
Birmingham Ironmakers	Birmingham, Alabama	West End Park
Charleston Seagulls	Charleston, South Carolina	Ball Park Field
Memphis Browns	Memphis, Tennessee	Olympic Park
Mobile Swamp Angels	Mobile, Alabama	Frascati Park
Nashville Blues	Nashville, Tennessee	Sulphur Spring Park
New Orleans Pelicans	New Orleans, Louisiana	Sportsman's Park
Savannah	Savannah, Georgia	Bolton Street Park

== Map of teams ==
Southern League teams

== Regular season ==
=== Summary ===
- The New Orleans Pelicans finished the season with the best record in the league for the first time in franchise history.
- On May 17, the Mobile Swamp Angels disbanded.
- On May 31, the Savannah club disbanded.
- On June 1, the Birmingham Ironmakers joined the league.
- On August 2, the Nashville Blues disbanded.

=== Standings ===
Southern League
Team	Win	Loss	%	GB
New Orleans Pelicans	78	37	.678	–
Charleston Seagulls	65	38	.631	7
Memphis Browns	64	51	.557	14
Nashville Blues	33	31	.516	25.5
Savannah	9	26	.257	29
Birmingham Ironmakers	19	63	.232	42.5
Mobile Swamp Angels	5	21	.192	44.5

== League Leaders ==
=== Batting leaders ===
Stat	Player	Total
AVG	Wally Andrews, Memphis Browns	.422
H	Wally Andrews, Memphis Browns	218
R	Wally Andrews, Memphis Browns	143
2B	Mike Hines, Charleston Seagulls	34
3B	Count Campau, Savannah/New Orleans	18
HR	Wally Andrews, Memphis Browns	28
SB	Ed Cartwright, New Orleans Pelicans	108

=== Pitching leaders ===
Stat	Player	Total
W	Fred Smith, Charleston Seagulls	33
ERA	John Ewing, New Orleans Pelicans	1.67
CG	Fred Smith, Charleston Seagulls	48
SHO	John Ewing, New Orleans Pelicans	5
IP	Fred Smith, Charleston Seagulls	448.1
SO	Fred Smith, Charleston Seagulls	221

== See also ==
- 1887 Major League Baseball season
