= 1888 Southern League season =

- League: Southern League
- Sport: Baseball
- Duration: April 7 – July 8
- Teams: 4

Regular season
- League champions: Birmingham Maroons

SL seasons
- ← 1887 1889 →

The 1888 Southern League was a minor league baseball season played between April 7 and July 8. Four teams played during the season with the top team winning the league pennant and championship.

The Birmingham Maroons won the Southern League championship, as they had the best record in the league.

== Team changes ==
- The Mobile Swamp Angels, Nashville Blues and the Savannah club did not return to the league after disbanding during the 1887 season.
- The Birmingham Ironmakers are renamed to the Birmingham Maroons.
- The Memphis Browns are renamed to the Memphis Grays.

== Teams ==
1888 Southern League
Team	City	Stadium
Birmingham Maroons	Birmingham, Alabama	West End Park
Charleston Seagulls	Charleston, South Carolina	Ball Park Field
Memphis Grays	Memphis, Tennessee	Olympic Park
New Orleans Pelicans	New Orleans, Louisiana	Crescent City Base Ball Park

== Map of teams ==
Southern League teams

== Regular season ==
=== Summary ===
- The Birmingham Maroons finished the season with the best record in the league for the first time in franchise history.
- On June 30, the Memphis Grays disbanded.
- On July 8, the league disbanded.

=== Standings ===
Southern League
Team	Win	Loss	%	GB
Birmingham Maroons	32	19	.627	–
Memphis Grays	26	24	.520	5.5
New Orleans Pelicans	25	32	.439	10
Charleston Seagulls	20	28	.417	10.5

== League Leaders ==
=== Batting leaders ===
Stat	Player	Total
AVG	Monk Cline, Memphis Grays	.339
H	Monk Cline, Memphis Grays	74
R	Monk Cline, Memphis Grays	55
2B	Monk Cline, Memphis Grays	20
3B	Fred Mann, Charleston Seagulls; Jimmy McAleer, Memphis Grays	4
HR	Perry Werden, New Orleans Pelicans	5
SB	Abner Powell, New Orleans Pelicans	49

=== Pitching leaders ===
Stat	Player	Total
W	John Ewing, Memphis Grays; Tom Sullivan, Birmingham Maroons	12
ERA	John Ewing, Memphis Grays	1.39
CG	Tom Sullivan, Birmingham Maroons; Wild Bill Widner, New Orleans Pelicans	21
SHO	Wild Bill Widner, New Orleans Pelicans	4
IP	Wild Bill Widner, New Orleans Pelicans	198.0
SO	Kid Nichols, Memphis Grays	84

== See also ==
- 1888 Major League Baseball season
