= 1892 Southern League season =

- League: Southern League
- Sport: Baseball
- Duration: April 25 – September 10
- Games: 124
- Teams: 8

Regular season
- League champions: Birmingham Grays

Playoffs
- League champions: Chattanooga Chatts

SL seasons
- ← 1889 1893 →

The 1892 Southern League was a Class B minor league baseball season played between April 25 and September 10. Eight teams played during the season with the top team in each half of the season qualifying for the post-season.

The Chattanooga Chatts won the Southern League championship, as they defeated the Birmingham Grays in the playoffs.

== League news ==
- After the league had shortened seasons due to disbanding in 1888 and 1889, the league was inactive in 1890 and 1891.
- The league introduced a playoff format to determine the champion, with the winner of each half of the season earning a berth in the championship round.

== Team changes ==
- The Atlanta club rejoins the league after the club disbanded during the 1889 season. The team is renamed to the Atlanta Firecrackers.
- The Birmingham Maroons rejoined the league after disbanding during the 1889 season. The team is renamed to the Birmingham Grays.
- The Charleston Seagulls leave the league and join the South Atlantic League.
- The Chattanooga club is renamed to the Chattanooga Chatts.
- Macon Central City joins the league as a new club. In 1889, the Charleston Seagulls played some home games in Macon. Macon last had their own team in 1886.
- The Memphis Grays rejoined the league after disbanding during the 1889 season. The team is renamed to the Memphis Giants.
- The Mobile Bears are renamed to the Mobile Blackbirds.
- The Montgomery Lambs join the league as a new team.

== Teams ==
1892 Southern League
Team	City	Stadium
Atlanta Firecrackers	Atlanta, Georgia	Brisbine Park
Birmingham Grays	Birmingham, Alabama	West End Park
Chattanooga Chatts	Chattanooga, Tennessee	Stanton Field
Macon Central City	Macon, Georgia	Central City Park
Memphis Giants	Memphis, Tennessee	Athletic Park
Mobile Blackbirds	Mobile, Alabama	Frascati Park
Montgomery Lambs	Montgomery, Alabama	Riverside Park
New Orleans Pelicans	New Orleans, Louisiana	Crescent City Base Ball Park

== Map of teams ==
Southern League teams

== Regular season ==
=== Summary ===
- The Chattanooga Chatts won the first half of the season.
- The Birmingham Grays won the second half of the season.
- The Birmingham Grays finished the season with the best record in the league for the second time in franchise history.

=== Standings ===
Southern League
Team	Win	Loss	%	GB
Birmingham Grays	73	50	.593	–
Mobile Blackbirds	66	57	.537	7
New Orleans Pelicans	66	57	.537	7
Montgomery Lambs	66	58	.532	7.5
Chattanooga Chatts	63	57	.525	8.5
Atlanta Firecrackers	58	65	.472	15
Macon Central City	51	69	.425	20.5
Memphis Giants	46	76	.377	26.5

== League Leaders ==
=== Batting leaders ===
Stat	Player	Total
AVG	Dick Phelan, Memphis Giants	.336
H	Al Weddige, Macon Central City	135
R	Sam Mills, New Orleans/Birmingham	94
2B	Unknown? Dunn, Montgomery Lambs; Dick Phelan, Memphis Giants	26
3B	John Newell, New Orleans Pelicans	20
HR	Jack Gans, Birmingham Grays	9
SB	Sam Mills, New Orleans/Birmingham	86

=== Pitching leaders ===
Stat	Player	Total
W	Hal Mauck, Birmingham Grays	27
CG	King Bailey, Macon Central City; Charlie Petty, Birmingham Grays	43
SHO	Pete Daniels, Mobile Blackbirds; Jack Keenan, Chattanooga Chatts; Bill Phillips, Chattanooga Chatts; Charlie Petty, Birmingham Grays	6
IP	Charlie Petty, Birmingham Grays	411.0
SO	Kirtley Baker, Chattanooga Chatts; Crazy Schmit, Memphis/Macon/Mobile	233

== Playoffs ==
- The Chattanooga Chatts won their first Southern League championship, defeating the Birmingham Grays in nine games.
- The ninth game and deciding game was not played when the Birmingham Grays refused to play, resulting in a forfeit.

=== Playoff bracket ===
Finals
1	Chattanooga	5
2	Birmingham	4

== See also ==
- 1892 Major League Baseball season
