= 1886 Southern League season =

- League: Southern League
- Sport: Baseball
- Duration: April 15 – September 4
- Games: 100
- Teams: 8

Regular season
- League champions: Atlanta Atlantas

SL seasons
- ← 1885 1887 →

The 1886 Southern League was a Class B minor league baseball season played between April 15 and September 4. Eight teams played a 100-game schedule, with the top team winning the league pennant and championship.

The Atlanta Atlantas won the Southern League championship, as they had the best record in the league.

== Team changes ==
- The Birmingham club and the Columbus Stars did not return to the league after disbanding late in the 1885 season.
- The Chattanooga Lookouts returned to the league after disbanding late in the 1885 season.
- The Charleston Seagulls join the league.
- The Memphis Reds are renamed to the Memphis Grays.
- The Savannah club joins the league.

== Teams ==
1886 Southern League
Team	City	Stadium
Atlanta Atlantas	Atlanta, Georgia	Athletic Park
Augusta Browns	Augusta, Georgia	Warren Park
Charleston Seagulls	Charleston, South Carolina	Ball Park Field
Chattanooga Lookouts	Chattanooga, Tennessee	Base Ball Grounds
Macon	Macon, Georgia	Mulberry Park
Memphis Grays	Memphis, Tennessee	Olympic Park
Nashville Americans	Nashville, Tennessee	Sulphur Spring Park
Savannah	Savannah, Georgia	Bolton Street Park

== Map of teams ==
Southern League teams

== Regular season ==
=== Summary ===
- The Atlanta Atlantas finished the season with the best record in the league for the second consecutive season.
- On July 5, the Augusta Browns disbanded.
- On July 9, the Chattanooga Lookouts disbanded.
- On September 4, the league announced the season had ended due to the 1886 Charleston earthquake.

=== Standings ===
Southern League
Team	Win	Loss	%	GB
Atlanta Atlantas	64	28	.696	–
Savannah	59	33	.641	5
Nashville Americans	46	43	.517	16.5
Memphis Grays	43	46	.483	19.5
Charleston Seagulls	44	49	.473	20.5
Augusta Browns	21	31	.404	23
Macon	32	59	.352	31.5
Chattanooga Lookouts	20	40	.333	28

== League Leaders ==
=== Batting leaders ===
Stat	Player	Total
AVG	Denny Lyons, Atlanta Atlantas	.327
H	Lefty Marr, Nashville Americans	129
R	Blondie Purcell, Atlanta Atlantas	105
2B	John Sneed, Memphis Grays	23
3B	Monk Cline, Atlanta Atlantas; Jim Field, Savannah; Tom Lynch, Atlanta Atlantas	8
HR	Blondie Purcell, Atlanta Atlantas	8
SB	Blondie Purcell, Atlanta Atlantas	72

=== Pitching leaders ===
Stat	Player	Total
W	Hank O'Day, Savannah	26
ERA	Gus Weyhing, Charleston Seagulls	0.76
CG	Ed Knouff, Memphis Grays; Hank O'Day, Savannah	36
SHO	Hank O'Day, Savannah; John Shaffer, Atlanta Atlantas	5
IP	Ed Knouff, Memphis Grays	341.2
SO	Ed Knouff, Memphis Grays	342

== See also ==
- 1886 Major League Baseball season
