= 1885 Southern League season =

- League: Southern League
- Sport: Baseball
- Duration: April 15 – September 17
- Games: 100
- Teams: 8

Regular season
- League champions: Atlanta Atlantas

SL seasons
- 1886 →

The 1885 Southern League was a minor league baseball season played between April 15 and September 17. Eight teams played a 100-game schedule, with the top team winning the league pennant and championship.

The Atlanta Atlantas won the Southern League championship, as they had the best record in the league.

== League formation ==
The original Southern League was formed on February 11, 1885, in Atlanta. It was the first professional league to operate in the South. Henry W. Grady, managing editor of The Atlanta Journal-Constitution, was selected as the league's first president. The eight-team circuit included the Atlanta Atlantas, Augusta Browns, Chattanooga Lookouts, Columbus Stars, Memphis Reds, Nashville Americans, and unnamed teams from Birmingham, Alabama, and Macon, Georgia.

== Teams ==
1885 Southern League
Team	City	Stadium
Atlanta Atlantas	Atlanta, Georgia	Athletic Park
Augusta Browns	Augusta, Georgia	Warren Park
Birmingham	Birmingham, Alabama	The Slag Pile
Chattanooga Lookouts	Chattanooga, Tennessee	Base Ball Grounds
Columbus Stars	Columbus, Georgia	Stars Park
Macon	Macon, Georgia	Mulberry Park
Memphis Reds	Memphis, Tennessee	Olympic Park
Nashville Americans	Nashville, Tennessee	Sulphur Spring Park

== Map of teams ==
Southern League teams

== Regular season ==
=== Summary ===
- The Atlanta Atlantas finished the season with the best record in the league for the first time in team history.
- Each team was scheduled to play 100 games during the season, but few would reach that mark as the Birmingham, Chattanooga, and Columbus clubs quit the league in the final two weeks of the season.

=== Standings ===
Southern League
Team	Win	Loss	%	GB
Atlanta Atlantas	66	32	.673	–
Augusta Browns	68	36	.654	1
Nashville Americans	62	39	.614	5.5
Macon	55	47	.539	13
Columbus Stars	49	47	.510	16
Memphis Reds	33	54	.379	27.5
Chattanooga Lookouts	33	61	.351	31
Birmingham	18	76	.191	46.5

== League Leaders ==
=== Batting leaders ===
Stat	Player	Total
AVG	Len Sowders, Nashville Americans	.300
H	Len Sowders, Nashville Americans	129
R	Len Sowders, Nashville Americans	92
2B	Len Sowders, Nashville Americans	23
3B	James Hillery, Birmingham Barons	12
HR	Wally Andrews, Columbus Stars; Joe Cahill, Atlanta Atlantas; Walt Goldsby, Atlanta Atlantas; Denny Lyons, Columbus Stars	6

=== Pitching leaders ===
Stat	Player	Total
W	John Hofford, Augusta Browns	38
ERA	Billy Taylor, Nashville Americans	0.39
CG	John Hofford, Augusta Browns	50
SHO	John Hofford, Augusta Browns	8
IP	John Hofford, Augusta Browns	457.0
SO	John Hofford, Augusta Browns	389

== See also ==
- 1885 Major League Baseball season
