= 1889 Southern League season =

- League: Southern League
- Sport: Baseball
- Duration: April 20 – July 6
- Teams: 6

Regular season
- League champions: New Orleans Pelicans

SL seasons
- ← 1888 1892 →

The 1889 Southern League was a minor league baseball season played between April 20 and July 6. Six teams played during the season with the top team winning the league pennant and championship.

The New Orleans Pelicans won the Southern League championship, as they had the best record in the league.

== Team changes ==
- The Memphis Grays returned to the league after disbanding during the 1888 season.
- The Atlanta and Chattanooga clubs re-joined the league.

== Teams ==
1889 Southern League
Team	City	Stadium
Atlanta	Atlanta, Georgia	Athletic Park
Birmingham Maroons; Mobile Bears	Birmingham, Alabama; Mobile, Alabama	West End Park; Frascati Park
Charleston Seagulls; Atlanta	Charleston, South Carolina; Macon, Georgia	Ball Park Field; Mulberry Park
Chattanooga	Chattanooga, Tennessee	Base Ball Grounds
Memphis Grays	Memphis, Tennessee	Olympic Park
New Orleans Pelicans	New Orleans, Louisiana	Crescent City Base Ball Park

== Map of teams ==
Southern League teams

== Regular season ==
=== Summary ===
- The New Orleans Pelicans finished the season with the best record in the league for the second time in franchise history.
- On May 16, the Birmingham Maroons disbanded after beginning the season 4–17. Four days later, the club was replaced by the Mobile Bears.
- On June 11, the Atlanta club and the Memphis Grays disbanded.
- The Charleston Seagulls moved some home games to Macon, Georgia and the club was renamed to Atlanta.
- On July 6, the league announced they were disbanding. The league would not return to play until 1892.

=== Standings ===
Southern League
Team	Win	Loss	%	GB
New Orleans Pelicans	45	9	.833	–
Charleston Seagulls/Atlanta	26	19	.578	14.5
Chattanooga	25	25	.500	18
Atlanta	14	22	.389	22
Memphis Grays	12	24	.333	23
Birmingham Maroons/Mobile Bears	12	35	.255	28.5

== League Leaders ==
=== Batting leaders ===
Stat	Player	Total
AVG	Mark Polhemus, New Orleans Pelicans	.365
H	Mark Polhemus, New Orleans Pelicans	89
R	Mark Polhemus, New Orleans Pelicans	66
2B	Mark Polhemus, New Orleans Pelicans	18
3B	Art McCoy, Chattanooga	9
HR	Mark Polhemus, New Orleans Pelicans	5
SB	Lawrence Ford, Chattanooga; Tommy Miller, Chattanooga	18

=== Pitching leaders ===
Stat	Player	Total
W	Jack Huston, New Orleans Pelicans	18
ERA	Joe Hennessey, Charleston/Atlanta	0.84
CG	Henry Jones, Chattanooga	25
SHO	William Carey, Atlanta; Frank Stapleton, Charleston/Atlanta	1
IP	Henry Jones, Chattanooga	237.1
SO	Henry Jones, Chattanooga	130

== See also ==
- 1889 Major League Baseball season
