= Savannah Electrics =

- 1893; (1886–1887, 1893–1894, 1898); Savannah, Georgia

Minor league affiliations
- Class: Independent (1886–1887); Class B (1893–1894); Independent 1898
- League: Southern League (1886–1887, 1893–1894, 1898)

Major league affiliations
- Team: None

Minor league titles
- League titles (0): None

Team data
- Name: Savannah (1886–1887); Savannah Electrics (1893); Savannah Modocs (1894); Savannah (1898)
- Ballpark: Bolton Street Park (1886–1887, 1893–1894, 1898)

The Savannah Electrics were a minor league baseball team based in Savannah, Georgia.

Savannah teams played exclusively as members of the Southern League (also called the interchangeable "Southern Association") in the 1886–1887, 1893–1894 and 1898 seasons, before folding during the 1898 season. Savannah teams of 1886 and 1887 preceded the 1893 "Electrics" in Southern League play. The 1894 team was known as the "Modocs."

The Savannah use of the "Electrics" nickname corresponds to local industry in the era, as the Brush Electric Company was in established in Savannah.

The Savannah teams hosted home minor league games at the Bolton Street Park.

Two Baseball Hall of Fame members played for Savannah teams. Hank O'Day played for the Savannah team in 1886 and Fred Clarke played for the 1894 Savanna Modocs.

== History ==
Minor league baseball began in Savannah with the 1884 Savannah Dixies, who played the season as members of the independent Georgia State League.

The "Electrics" were preceded in Southern League play by the "Savannah" team, who played as members of the 1886 and 1887 Southern League, without a team nickname, common in the era. In 1886, the Savannah team joined the Class B level, eight–team Southern League. The Atlanta Atlantas, Augusta Browns, Charleston Seagulls, Chattanooga Lookouts, Macon, Memphis Grays and Nashville Americans teams joined Savannah in beginning league play on April 15, 1886. Savannah placed second in the final 1886 Southern League standings. The team ended the 1886 season with a record of 59–33, placing second in the standings as the team played under managers Charlie Morton and Pete Hotaling. Savannah finished 5.0 games behind the first place Atlanta.

Future Baseball Hall of Fame member Hank O'Day played for the 1886 Savannah team, compiling a 26–11 record as a pitcher. After his successful season with Savannah, O'Day was immediately signed by the major league Detroit Wolverines and joined the Wolverines to finish the 1886 season.

Savannah continued play in the 1887 Southern League, with the team folding during the season. Savannah disbanded May 31, 1887 and ended their season with a record of 9–26. The returning Charlie Morton and John Peltz served as managers.

In 1893, the Savannah "Electrics" (also called the "Rabbits") rejoined the 12–team, Class B level Southern League, with Jim Manning serving player-manager and owner. The Electrics finished a close fourth place in the standings, as the league ended the season early. Manning played second base for Savannah, hitting .290 in 89 games. However, the team and the league folded on August 12, 1893. Despite the league folding, the Savannah team made money, as Manning was left with a $4,000 profit. The Sporting Life reported that Manning left "with the well-wishes of everybody in Savannah" after the season, adding, "There was no kicking, no fighting or no tough ball playing allowed, and it was a pleasure to see the game played. If ever a man deserved to make money he did. He came here a stranger to every one in the city, but by his gentlemanly conduct and courteous treatment of every one he came in contact with, he soon made a host of friends." Manning's Savannah Electrics ended the Southern League season with a record of 53–38, ending in fourth place tie with the Memphis Giants who had the same record. Savannah and Memphis finished 1.5 games behind the first place Charleston Seagulls when the league stopped play.

The Savannah "Electrics" nickname corresponds to local industry in the era. In 1882, the Brush Electric Company of Savannah was formed. Today, the company is still in operation in Savannah, known now as Georgia Power. The Hamilton mansion in Savannah was the first residence in Savannah to receive power from the Brush Electric Company in 1883. The mansion's owner, Samuel Pugh Hamilton, became president of the company.

The 1893 Southern League was the largest circuit in the league's history and The 12–team league was hampered by insufficient financing and revenues. The owners of the Birmingham team, Charleston Seagulls, and Nashville Tigers turned their franchises over to the league, which took over the daily operations of the teams. A meeting was held on July 1, 1893, in which the league's president, Hart, resigned, with those in attendance asking him unsuccessfully to reconsider his resignation. six days later, J.B. Nicklin of Chattanooga was elected as the new league president. After the Birmingham team was transferred to Pensacola, Florida, the team was soon quarantined due to the outbreak of yellow fever. The quarantine situation, in addition to ongoing financial struggles, caused the league to end the season on August 12, 1893.

After folding the season before, the Southern League resumed play in 1894, with the Savannah "Modocs" as a member, before the team folded during the season. After Jim Manning sold the team, Jeff Miller, became the owner of the Savannah Modocs and renovated the team's home ballpark, the Bolton Street Park. On June 27, 1894, the Modocs folded and ended their Southern League season with a record of 30–27. The Atlanta Atlantas, Charleston Seagulls and Macon Hornets also folded on June 27. John McCloskey served as manager.

In 1894, some Southern League teams were forced to sell players to other clubs in order to stay financially solvent. After Atlanta, Charleston, Macon and Savannah folded due to finances, only the Nashville, Mobile, New Orleans, and Memphis teams continued play into the second half of the season. With only the four teams remaining, the Southern League folded nine games into the second half, on July 7, 1894.

Baseball Hall of Fame member Fred Clarke played for the Modocs in 1894, before advancing to the major leagues that season. At age 21, in his second professional season, Clarke hit .311 with 21 stolen bases in 54 games for Savannah, while playing left field. Savannah manager John McCloskey recognized Clarke's talents and recommended him to the major league Louisville Colonels, who immediately signed Clarke after Savannah folded. Clarke began his major league career by hitting .274 in 76 games as a rookie in 1894.

In 1898, Savannah briefly returned to the Southern League, before the team again folded during the season. On May 16, 1898, Savannah folded from the Southern League and ended their season with a record of 14–11. The Atlanta Crackers, Montgomery Senators and New Orleans Pelicans franchises also disbanded on May 16. Jack Huston and A. C. Cooper served as the Savannah managers. The Southern League folded on May 19, 1898, with Savannah in third place, finishing behind first place Augusta and the second place Charleston Seagulls.

Savannah, Georgia next hosted minor league baseball when the 1904 Savannah Pathfinders began play as members of the Class C level South Atlantic League. Today, the Savannah "Bananas" play as members of the Coastal Plain League, a summer collegiate baseball league, after being founded in 2016.

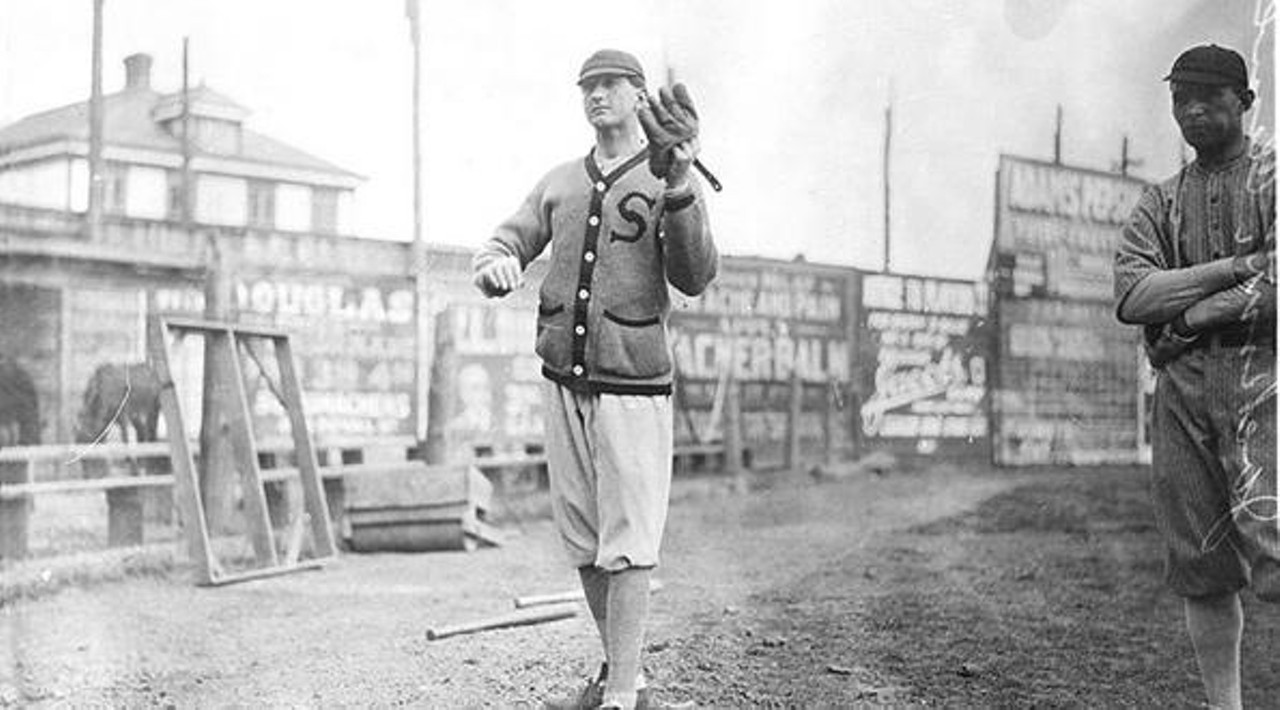
(1909) Shoeless Joe Jackson, Savannah Indians at Bolton Street Park.

== The ballpark ==
The Savannah teams hosted Southern League home minor league home games at the Bolton Street Park. The ballpark was the first professional baseball field in Savannah and was located on Bolton Street near Atlantic Avenue. Prior to the 1894 season, Jeff Miller, owner of the Savannah Modocs, renovated the ballpark. The grandstand was expanded to include 500 open chairs, a cupola was added to shield the press box, the bleachers were expanded, and designated areas were created for carriages, with hitching posts.

The Washington Senators held their team spring training at the Bolton Street Park ballpark in March 1892.

Today, the Fairmount Baptist Church and Shoeless Joe Jackson Museum & Baseball Library book box occupy the site. In 1951, the Fairmount Baptist Church moved its church building from 57th and Waters Street to the ballpark site at 721 E Belmont Street. In March 2022, the Shoeless Joe Jackson Museum & Baseball Library opened a community book box at the site, near Fairmount Baptist Church. Shoeless Joe Jackson played for 1909 Savannah Indians, winning the league batting title with the team playing home games at Bolton Street Park.

== Timeline ==
Year(s)	# Yrs.	Team	Level	League	Ballpark
1886–1887	2	Savannah	Independent	Southern League	Bolton Street Park
1893	1	Savannah Electrics	Class B	Southern League	Bolton Street Park
1894	1	Savannah Modocs	Class B	Southern League	Bolton Street Park
1898	1	Savannah	Independent	Southern League	Bolton Street Park

== Year–by–year records ==
Year	Record	Finish	Manager	Playoffs/Notes
1886	59–33	2nd	Charlie Morton / Pete Hotaling	No playoffs held
1887	9–26	NA	Charlie Morton / John Peltz	Team folded May 31
1893	53–38	4th (tie)	Jim Manning	League folded August 12
1894	30–26	NA	John McCloskey	Team folded June 27
1898	14–11	3rd	Jack Huston / A. C. Cooper	Team folded May 16; League folded May 19

== Notable alumni ==
- Fred Clarke (1894) Inducted Baseball Hall of Fame, 1945
- Hank O'Day (1886) Inducted Baseball Hall of Fame, 2013
- Tug Arundel (1886)
- Jim Burns (1893)
- Frank Butler (1894)
- Count Campau (1887)
- Percy Coleman (1898)
- Hub Collins (1886)
- Frank Connaughton (1893)
- Joe Dowie (1898)
- Martin Duke (1894)
- Bob Emslie (1887)
- Jim Field (1886)
- Mike Gaule (1887)
- Bill Geiss (1894)
- Bill George (1893)
- Tom Gillen (1886)
- Charlie Hoover (1894)
- Pete Hotaling (1886, MGR)
- Jerry Hurley (1893)
- Ed Hutchinson (1887)
- Billy Klusman (1893)
- Mac MacArthur (1887)
- Jim Manning (1893, MGR)
- John McCloskey (1894, MGR)
- Chippy McGarr (1893)
- William McLaughlin (1886)
- George Meakim (1893)
- Joe Miller (1886)
- Gene Moriarty (1886)
- Charlie Morton (1886–1887, MGR)
- Joe Neale (1886)
- Tricky Nichols (1887)
- The Only Nolan (1886)
- John Peltz (1887, MGR)
- Harrison Peppers (1894)
- Bill Quarles (1893)
- Toad Ramsey (1894)
- Charlie Reilly (1887)
- Lev Shreve (1886)
- Len Stockwell (1886)
- George Strief (1886)
- George Stultz (1898)
- Dan Sullivan (1886)
- Sy Sutcliffe (1886)
- Tub Welch (1894)
- Jimmy Wolf (1894)

== See also ==
Savannah Electrics players
Savannah Modocs players
Savannah minor league players
