= Nashville Blues =

Former Minor League Baseball team in Nashville, Tennessee

- 1887; Nashville, Tennessee
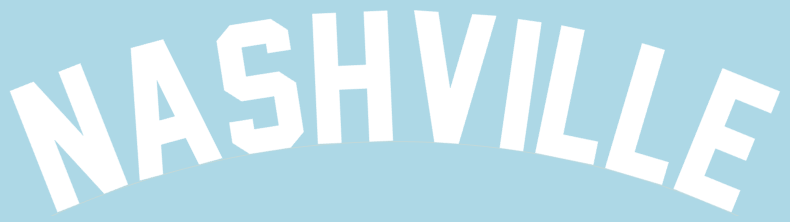

Minor league affiliations
- Class: Unclassified
- League: Southern League

Minor league titles
- Pennants (0): None

Team data
- Name: Nashville Blues
- Colors: Light blue, white, red
- Ballpark: Sulphur Spring Park
- Owner/ Operator: Nashville Base Ball Association
- President: William M. Duncan
- Manager: Jim Clinton (May 18–August 6); George Bradley (April 16–May 17)

The Nashville Blues were a minor league baseball team that played in the Southern League in 1887. They were located in Nashville, Tennessee, and played their home games at Sulphur Spring Park, later known as Sulphur Dell.

Managed by George Bradley, the team attained first place on May 9, approximately three weeks into the season, in the midst of a 12-game winning streak. The Blues stayed atop the standings for over a month, but were weakened by the resignation of Bradley on May 17 and the sale of ace pitcher Al Maul on June 13. Though little else changed with the roster, the team was not the same after these losses. Under new manager Jim Clinton, the Blues fell to fourth place out of five teams on July 19, where they remained until disbanding on August 6.

The Blues were operated by the Nashville Base Ball Association, which raised US$15,000 to fiancé the team through the sale of stock. This capital and the revenue from paid attendance at Sulphur Spring Park was not sufficient to cover the $3,000 per month necessary to fund the team. After losing nearly $18,000, the directors chose to cut their losses and withdraw from the Southern League rather than spend the $6,000 needed to play the season to its completion.

A total of 21 players competed in at least one game for the Blues. Of these, 11 also played for major league teams. George Bradley, Jim Clinton, Larry Corcoran, and Jackie Hayes all came to Nashville with considerable big league experience. Among the players who went on to have notable major league careers afterward were Spider Clark, Mortimer Hogan, and Al Maul.

== History ==
=== Formation ===
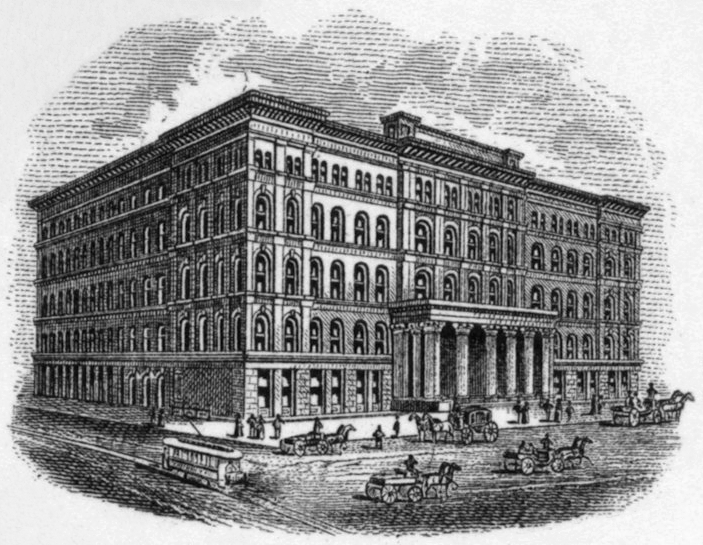
The Southern League of 1887 was organized on October 7, 1886, at the Maxwell House Hotel in Nashville.

Professional baseball was first played in Nashville, Tennessee, by the Nashville Americans, who were charter members of the original Southern League from 1885 to 1886 and played their home games at Sulphur Spring Park, later renamed Sulphur Dell. This ballpark was to be the home of Nashville's minor league teams through 1963. The Southern League of 1886 gained a disgraceful reputation from the way clubs and league officials engaged in fraudulent activities, gambling, deals, and bargains with seemingly no law or justice being maintained by President Alexander Proudfit.

League representatives met at the Maxwell House Hotel in Nashville on October 7, 1886, to discuss the affairs of the previous season and lay the groundwork for a more principled league in the next. Nashville was represented by local baseball magnates John Morrow, who was elected to serve as the league's president, and William Cherry. It was decided that each team would pay monthly dues of US$150 plus a $2,000 deposit to guarantee they would play the entire season. No limit was placed on player salaries. The meeting adjourned without having finalized the league's membership, but at the January 20, 1887, meeting in Birmingham, teams were granted to Charleston, Memphis, Mobile, Nashville, New Orleans, and Savannah. Also, the guarantee was reduced to $1,000, as other candidate cities, finding the sum too high, refused to join.

The Nashville Base Ball Association, a corporation which would operate and finance the local team with $15,000 of capital stock, met on December 21 to elect William M. Duncan as its president. The group hired as the team's manager George Bradley, a veteran player with 10 years of major league experience.

Nashville's team has come to be known as the Blues. There are no contemporary references of this moniker being attributed to the team, but it is likely an allusion to the light blue shirts and pants they wore. Occasionally, they were termed the "White Sox" because of their white stockings. As was common at the time, clubs were usually called by the names of their cities. Newspapers generally referred to them as simply Nashville, the Nashville club, or the Nashvilles. There was a team of amateur players from Vanderbilt University known as the Blues concurrent to the professional team.

=== Spring training ===
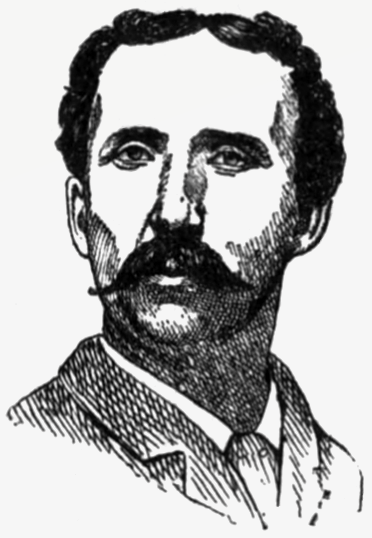
George Bradley, manager and third baseman of the Blues

Player-manager Bradley wasted no time in beginning to acquire players for the coming season. He pledged to field "the hardest working organization" Nashville had yet seen. Eight of the 12 players who began the season with the Blues had prior experience on major league teams. The most seasoned members of the roster were Bradley, Jim Clinton, Larry Corcoran, and Jackie Hayes, who had each appeared in at least 275 big league games. Bradley's men were to report to Sulphur Spring Park on March 15 to begin practice.

Their spring training regimen included several series of exhibition games against amateur, minor, and major league teams, many of which traveled south to prepare for their seasons in a warmer climate. The first series was against the minor league Syracuse Stars of the International Association from March 23 to 25. The Nashvilles lost the first game, 15–8, but won the next two games, 7–5 and 11–10. Their next opponents were the Memphis Browns. The cross-state Southern League rivals planned a best-of-seven series to decide the "championship of the state". Memphis took the first game, 5–3, but Nashville tied the series with an 8–1 game-two win. The Browns handily won the next pair of games, 13–1 and 20–5. Nashville, on the brink of defeat, won game five, 12–3, but lost a decisive game six and the series, 4–0. From April 7 to 9, the Blues won all three games played against an amateur team from Evansville, Indiana, 3–0, 7–1, and 13–1. The National League's Detroit Wolverines came to Nashville for a three-game series from April 11 to 13. Detroit narrowly won the first game, 4–3. The next two meetings were easily won by the National Leaguers, 8–0 and 12–2.

=== The season ===
==== Under Bradley (April 16–May 17) ====
The Nashville Blues were slated to open the Southern League championship season of 1887 at Sulphur Spring Park on April 16. Their Opening Day roster consisted of pitchers Larry Corcoran and Al Maul; catchers Bud Manion and Frank Nicholas; first baseman Michael Firle; second baseman Steve Matthias; third baseman/manager George Bradley; shortstop Robert Burks; left fielder Jim Clinton; center fielder Icicle Reeder; and right fielder Jackie Hayes. An additional right fielder, Mortimer Hogan, began the season on the sick list.

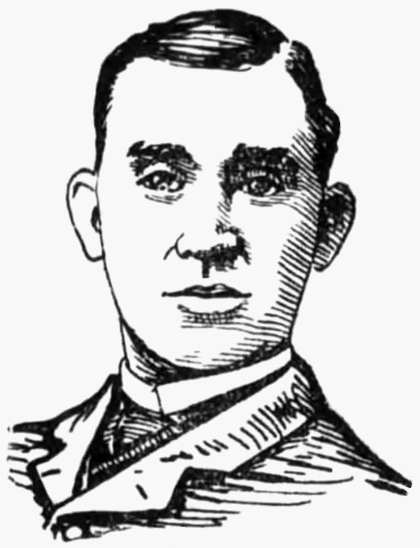
Second baseman Steve Matthias was named team captain on April 18.

Playing against the Charleston Quakers in the season opener, the Blues got out to a promising start with two runs in the first inning, but both teams would go on to score often in the game in which they had 27 hits and 11 errors between them. It was an error that helped decide the game in the bottom of the tenth inning. Tied, 8–8, Clinton and Reeder collided in the outfield while giving chase to a fly ball for which neither called and neither caught. The error led to a Charleston batter reaching second base and later scoring, which resulted in an Opening Day loss for the Nashvilles, 9–8. The game was attended by about 1,000 people. Cold weather and muddy conditions at the ballpark prevented the playing of the next game on April 18. On the off-day, Bradley selected Matthias as team captain, and he chose Clinton as second captain. The Blues had their first win on April 19. Tied 9–9 in the ninth inning of another game featuring much offense, Maul prevented the visitors from scoring any additional runs with the catch of a sharply hit fly ball to right field. What made the otherwise routine play spectacular was that he had to back halfway up the embankment and then fell down but reached up just in time to catch the ball for the out. Nashville broke the tie in their half of the ninth, winning 10–9. The Nashvilles concluded the opening series with a 12–8 win on April 20.

At the time, the state of Tennessee had a blue law which banned the playing of baseball on Sundays. However, with the encouragement of city, county, and state officials that the sport prevented crime and promoted good morals, the Nashville club endeavored to make up an April 22 rain-out with the Savannah club by playing on Sunday, April 24. The park was so crowded with patrons who were normally unable to attend games on working days that several hundred were allowed to view the game from the field. Nashville won, 15–12, without incident or police interference. A group of 35 ministers met two days later and resolved to circulate a petition among citizens demanding that the government enforce the law forbidding Sunday baseball. The Davidson County grand jury later indicted the involved players as well as the directors and officers of the Nashville Base Ball Association. Under examination, irregularities were found in the passage of the law's bill, leading lawyers in the service of the team to believe it to be unconstitutional. Judge Granville Ridley ruled to the contrary, finding the law was passed legally. Jackie Hayes was tried as a test case, convicted, and fined $25. The case was appealed to the Tennessee Supreme Court after a retrial was denied. The higher court upheld the Sunday baseball law as being constitutional. The locals made no further attempt to play on Sundays.

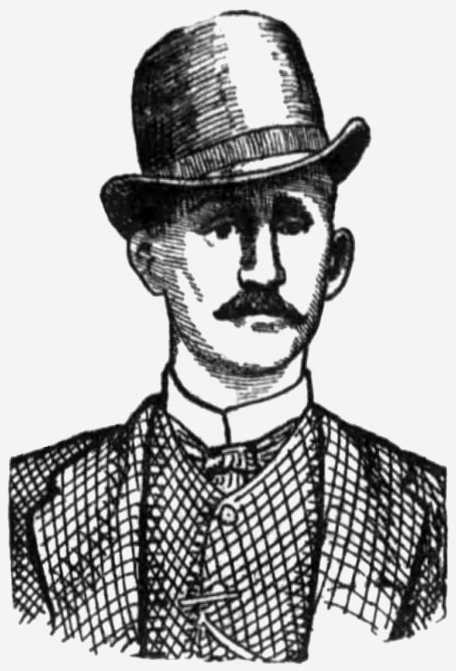
Catcher Frank Nicholas was one of nine men to play the entire season with Nashville.

Nashville's first roster changes began after the controversial Sunday game. On April 25, amateur Robert Greene was given a trial at shortstop but was not retained by the team. That same day, Matthias was badly injured while sliding into home plate and had to be removed from the game. Knowing the importance of his position as captain and aware that he would miss several games, he chose to vacate his captaincy, and Clinton assumed the role. New pitcher Bill Mountjoy led the Nashvilles to a 7–5 victory over Memphis in his debut on April 29. Corcoran was scheduled to pitch on April 30 against Memphis, but was replaced by Bradley at the last moment. Before the game, Corcoran was found to be drunk. Memphis manager John Sneed and pitcher Bob Black allegedly got him intoxicated to help the Browns win, thus aiding individuals from Memphis who had wagered a large amount of money against Nashville. When Bradley heard rumors of the plan, he removed Corcoran from the game, and pitched Nashville to a win himself. The directors of the club fined Corcoran $50 for his drunkenness and unsatisfactory play, suspended him indefinitely, and eventually sold him to the National League's Indianapolis Hoosiers for $500 on May 9.

Through the first month of the young season, the Blues were playing well and held an 8–3 (.727) record, putting them in second place. On May 7, competing for the first time in 10 days since his injury, Matthias was severely injured again when a Mobile Swamp Angels player collided with him at second base as he attempted to turn a double play in the third inning. Once again, he had to be removed from the game and was released sometime before May 22. Shorthanded from this injury and with Bradley and Mountjoy temporarily sidelined by illnesses, former Vanderbilt Commodores pitcher Perian Smith was recruited for the May 11 game versus Mobile in which he held opposing batters to four runs on nine hits in the 10–4 Nashville victory. Mortimer Hogan, on the sick list since before Opening Day, found it his duty to play against doctors' orders and help his teammates, making his debut in right field on May 12. Pitcher Joseph Masran was acquired and joined the team on May 14. Even in the midst of illness and injury, the Blues won 12 consecutive games from April 28 to May 14, and moved into first place on May 9. When the second-place New Orleans Pelicans ended their streak on May 16, Nashville's record was 17–4 (.810).

A 10-day break in the schedule began on May 17 with Bradley resigning as manager, but retaining his playing position, thinking it best for his own health and that of the club. He had been sick since May 7, and was granted a leave of absence to attended to himself and his seriously ill child at home in Cincinnati.

==== Under Clinton (May 18–August 6) ====
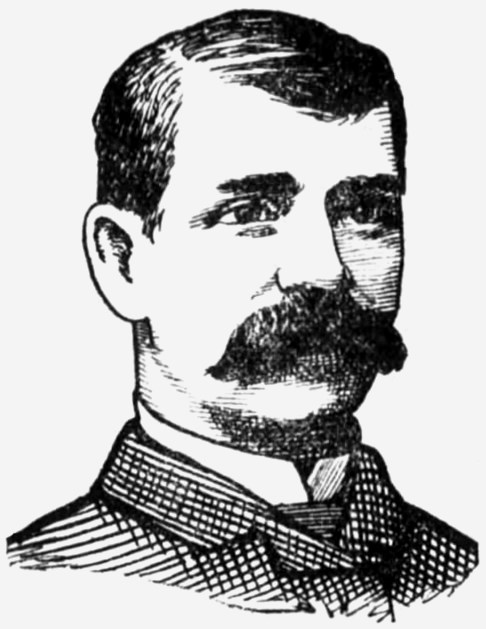
Team captain Jim Clinton became manager on May 18.

Jim Clinton, then the team's captain, was selected to manage the club after Bradley's resignation. Hogan, now fully recovered, was made the new captain. Looking to remain sharp for the resumption their championship schedule, the Nashvilles defeated the H. W. Gradys, an amateur team from Atlanta, 17–6 and 9–6, on May 25 and 26. Beginning with the May 27 game at Charleston, telegraphed descriptions of road games would be provided at the Masonic Theater in Nashville.

The league experienced some contraction in the latter half of May as financial problems forced Mobile to drop out after May 17 and Savannah to fold after May 28. The Birmingham Ironmakers assumed Mobile's place on June 1. The resulting five-team league made for an awkward schedule with President Morrow initially instructing teams to treat scheduled games against Savannah as off-days, but the schedule was altered a week later to remedy the problem as well as possible.

Additional team changes included the release of pitcher Mountjoy on June 1. His replacement, amateur Albert Gibson, pitched in his first game on June 10. The Blues also gained pitcher Patrick Kelly, formerly of the Mobiles, who made his Blues debut on June 11. On June 13, Nashville's ace pitcher Al Maul was sold to the National League's Philadelphia Quakers for $2,500. His 9–3 record and 2.91 earned run average notwithstanding, with no protection granted to Southern League players the offer was too grand for the club to pass up. Second baseman Spider Clark joined the team on June 28, but was released on July 2 after going hitless in three games. Even with the managerial change and several roster moves, the Blues maintained their hold on first place through their return to Sulphur Spring Park on June 15.

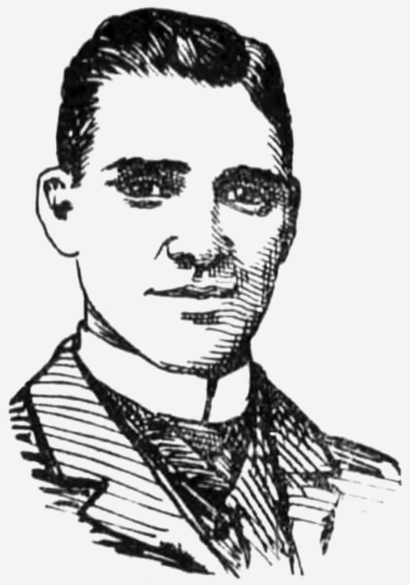
Pitcher Al Maul was sold to the Philadelphia Quakers for $2,500 on June 13.

Nashville, however, soon hit a slump with no sign of improvement. A six-game losing streak to Charleston and Memphis dropped the team to third place by July 4, and more losses caused them to fall to fourth by the end of the homestand on July 16 at 30–21 (.588). They completed the series at home with a 9–2 win over the Pelicans. The team that had done so well in the early part of the season had not been the same since Bradley stepped down as its manager. The loss of Maul, for both his on-field performance and encouragement given to players, was a follow-up blow. The shorthanded and strained pitching corps was the area most in need of improvement. Gibson dislocated his ankle on July 8 and was done for the season. Poor outings by Kelly and Masran and a failure on the part of the team's directors to bring in new twirlers seemed to hint at Nashville's fate. Rumors began to circulate through the city that the ball club would disband before hitting the road, but the team's directors met and resolved to play the season through to the end.

Two new players were added to the roster, although briefly, in late July. Amateur outfielder Tom Ford joined the team for a three-game series in Birmingham from July 19 to 21. In dire need of new arms, pitcher Alexander joined the team on July 25, but he was released on July 31 after three disastrous outings.

The Blues lost their August 2 game at New Orleans, 8–4, in 11 innings. The August 3 game was rained out, so the team returned to Nashville that night to wait for their next-scheduled home game on August 10. The team, still standing in fourth place with a 33–31 (.516) record, had taken to the field for the last time.

=== Dissolution ===
On August 6, the directors of the Nashville Base Ball Association decided to withdraw from the Southern League after having lost nearly $18,000 on the venture. This meant the forfeiture of their $1,000 guarantee, but saved them the approximate $4,000 to $6,000 that would have been necessary to finish the season. Unlike the poorly patronized Nashville Americans in late 1886, who were so far down in the standings as to be virtually out of pennant contention, the Nashville public did not support the Blues even when they held a sizable first-place lead in the early goings of the season. Attendance at Sulphur Spring Park, less than an average of 600 people per game, was not enough to cover the $100-per-day-minimum required to run the team. It would have taken an average of at least 1,000 fans to adequately cover daily expenses.

There was concern across the remaining Southern League cities that the loss of Nashville, the third team to drop out after Mobile and Savannah, would spell the end of the circuit, but league directors met on August 10 in Birmingham and voted to complete the season with a new schedule. The four-team league concluded the season on October 10 without losing any more members. New Orleans won the pennant.

Nashville baseball magnates desired to field a team in 1888, but their decision to do so hinged on their ability to play Sunday games. This would generate additional revenue beyond what was brought in from playing the other six days of the week. On January 10, 1888, the Tennessee Supreme Court upheld the "Sunday base ball law", making it a misdemeanor to play on Sundays. Potential investors consequently refused to finance a team. Nashville did not field another professional baseball club for the next five years until the city was awarded a franchise in the 1893 Southern League called the Nashville Tigers.

== Season results ==
Nashville dropped out of the Southern League on August 6. They were preceded in disbandment by Mobile on May 17 and Savannah on May 28. Records for these three disbanded clubs are given as they stood on their last days of competition. Birmingham took Mobile's place in the schedule, but entered the league with a clean slate.

1887 Southern League standings (April 16–October 10)
Team	Games	Won	Lost	Win %	Finish	GB
New Orleans Pelicans	111	72	39	.649	1st	—
Charleston Quakers	107	66	41	.617	2nd	4
Memphis Browns	108	63	45	.583	3rd	7 1/2
Birmingham Ironmakers	80	17	63	.213	4th	39 1/2
Nashville Blues	64	33	31	.516	DNF	DNF
Savannah	29	5	24	.172	DNF	DNF
Mobile Swamp Angels	22	5	17	.227	DNF	DNF

== Ballpark ==
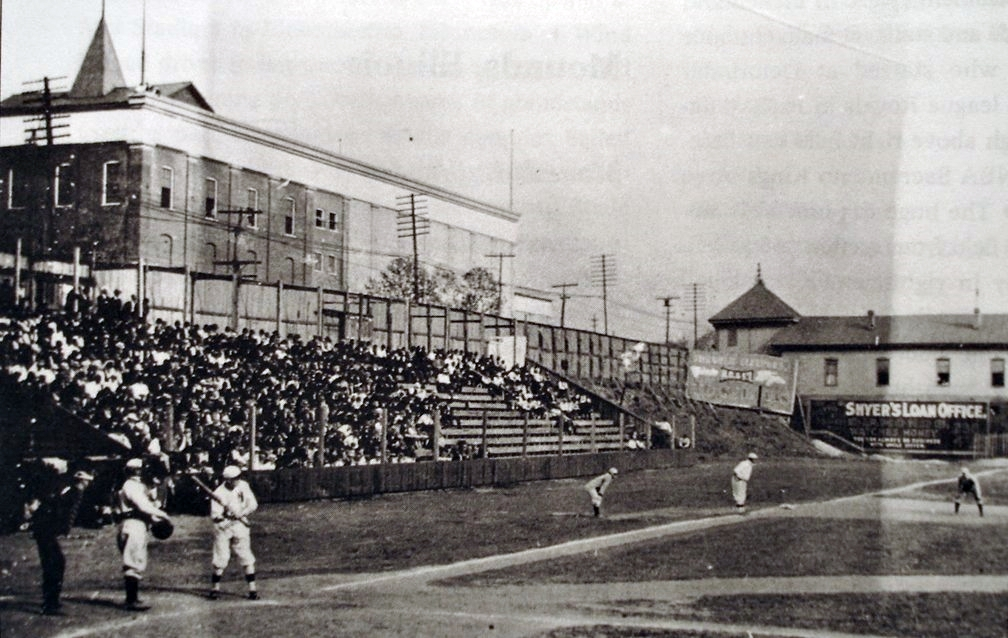
Sulphur Spring Park in 1908

The Blues played their home games at Nashville's Sulphur Spring Park. The first grandstand was built at the northeastern corner of the block bounded by modern-day Jackson Street, Fourth Avenue North, Harrison Street, and Fifth Avenue North to accommodate fans of the Nashville Americans in 1885. Located in Sulphur Springs Bottom, the land had hitherto been little more than solely a baseball field and required improvements to make it suitable for professional teams. The main Jackson Street entrance led past the ticket booth and into the grandstand's reserved seats behind home plate and a screen backstop. Rooms for players, directors, scorers, and reporters were built under the grandstand. Restrooms and water fountains, which pumped up sulphur water from the springs below, were also built. The distance to the outfield fence was 362 feet (110 m) to left and right fields and 485 feet (148 m) to center. The grandstand and fences received new coats of paint and whitewash in preparation for the Blues' season. In late April, a stand for boys under 15 years old was built on the first base side.

The facility, known as Sulphur Dell from 1908, was demolished in 1969 after serving as the home of the Nashville Vols from 1901 to 1963. Since 2015, the site has been the location of First Horizon Park, the home stadium of the Triple-A Nashville Sounds baseball team.

== Uniforms ==
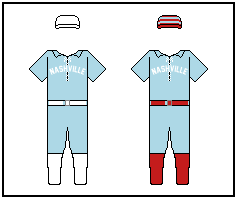
Nashville's uniforms

The Nashville Blues wore two sets of uniforms, one for home games and one for games played on the road. Both outfits consisted of light blue shirts and pants. One set paired these light blue articles with white caps, belts, and stockings, quite similar to the uniforms worn by the National League's Chicago White Stockings. The other combination had red belts and stockings matched with red caps with blue trimmings. The April 17 edition of The Daily American also mentioned the shirts having white lettering and lauded the outfits as "most striking and picturesque." There are no known photographs or illustrations of the team in uniform.

== Players ==
A total of 21 players competed in at least one game for the Blues during the 1887 season. Only 9 of the 12 men on the April 16 Opening Day roster remained with Nashville for the entire season. Eleven also played for major league teams during their careers.

Table key
Position(s)	The player's primary fielding position(s)
MLB	Indicates that a player played in at least one game for a major league team

Positions key
P	Pitcher	SS	Shortstop
C	Catcher	LF	Left fielder
1B	First baseman	CF	Center fielder
2B	Second baseman	RF	Right fielder
3B	Third baseman	OF	Outfielder

1887 Nashville Blues roster
Name	Position(s)	Notes	MLB	Ref.
Alexander	P	Joined on July 25; Released on July 31	No	
George Bradley	3B	On Opening Day roster; Played entire season	Yes	
Robert Burks	SS	On Opening Day roster; Played entire season	No	
Spider Clark	2B	Joined on June 28; Released on July 2	Yes	
Jim Clinton	LF	On Opening Day roster; Played entire season	Yes	
Larry Corcoran	P	On Opening Day roster; Sold to the Indianapolis Hoosiers on May 9	Yes	
Michael Firle	1B	On Opening Day roster; Played entire season	No	
Tom Ford	CF/RF	Joined on July 19; Released on July 21	Yes	
Albert Gibson	P	Joined on June 10; Lost to injury on July 8, but remained with team	No	
Robert Greene	SS	Joined on April 25; Played only one game	No	
Jackie Hayes	2B	On Opening Day roster; Played entire season	Yes	
Mortimer Hogan	RF	On Opening Day roster; Played entire season	Yes	
Patrick Kelly	P	Joined on June 11; Played remainder of season	No	
Bud Manion	2B	On Opening Day roster; Played entire season	No	
Joseph Masran	P/OF	Joined on May 14; Played remainder of season	No	
Steve Matthias	2B	On Opening Day roster; Released by May 22	Yes	
Al Maul	P/RF	On Opening Day roster; Sold to the Philadelphia Quakers on June 13	Yes	
Bill Mountjoy	P/RF	Joined on April 29; Released on June 1	Yes	
Frank Nicholas	C	On Opening Day roster; Played entire season	No	
Icicle Reeder	CF	On Opening Day roster; Played entire season	Yes	
Perian Smith	P	Joined on May 11; Played only one game	No	
