= Wally Andrews =

American baseball player (1859–1940)

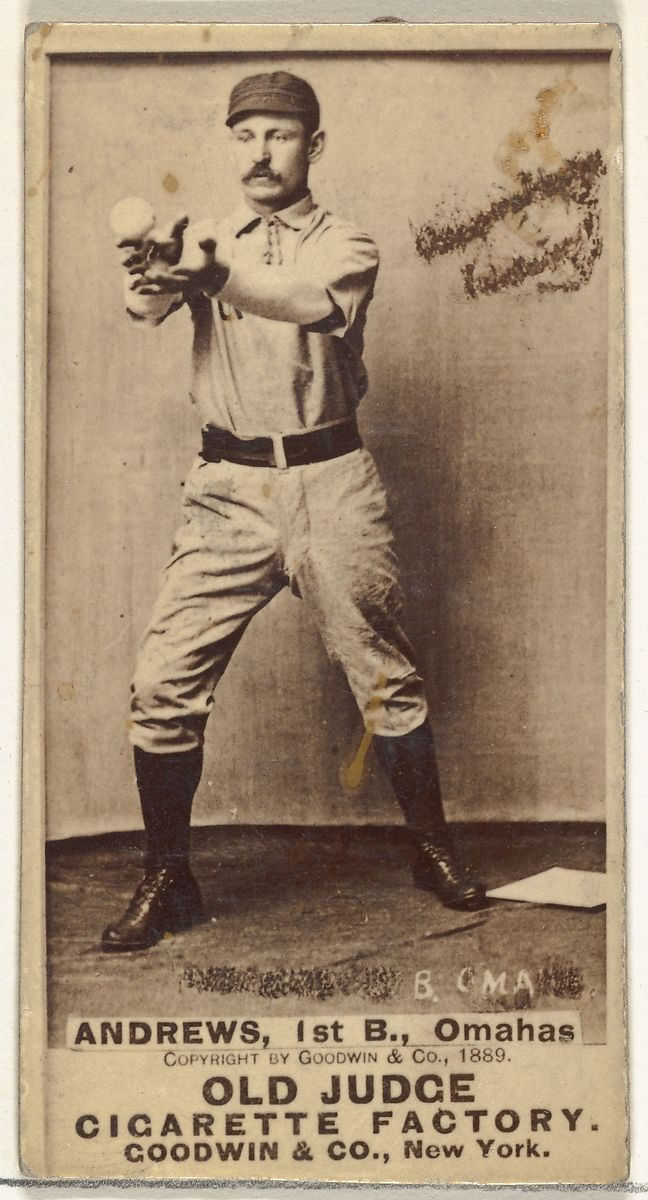
- First baseman
- Born: September 18, 1859; Philadelphia
- Died: January 20, 1940 (aged 80); Indianapolis
- Batted: Right Threw: Right

MLB debut
- May 22, 1884, for the Louisville Eclipse

Last MLB appearance
- August 8, 1888, for the Louisville Colonels

MLB statistics
- Batting average: .197
- Home runs: 0
- Runs batted in: 14
- Stats at Baseball Reference

Teams
- Louisville Eclipse/Colonels (1884, 1888)

William Walter Andrews (September 18, 1859 – January 20, 1940), was a professional baseball player who played catcher in the Major Leagues for the Louisville Colonels.

In 1887, with the minor league Memphis Browns, Andrews hit .422 with 218 hits, 143 runs scored, 28 home runs and 52 stolen bases in 111 games.
