= Nashville Americans =

Former Minor League Baseball team in Nashville, Tennessee

- Founded in 1884; 1885–1886; Nashville, Tennessee
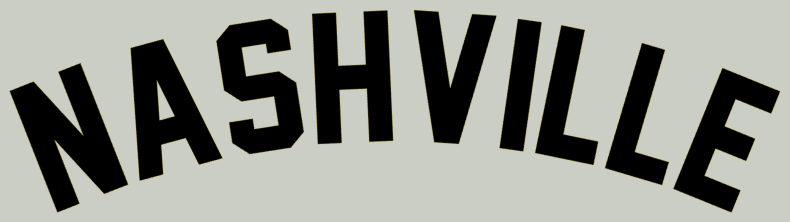

Minor league affiliations
- Class: Class B (1886); Unclassified (1885)
- League: Southern League (1885–1886)

Major league affiliations
- Team: Unaffiliated (1885–1886)

Minor league titles
- Pennants (0): None

Team data
- Name: Nashville Americans (1884–1886)
- Colors: Gray, red
- Ballpark: Sulphur Spring Park (1885–1886); Nashville Fairgrounds (1884)
- Owner/ Operator: American Baseball Association/Nashville Base Ball Association
- President: Milan Woods (1886)
- Manager: Walt Goldsby (1886); John R. Mayberry (1885); Nate Kellogg (1885); Will Bryan (1885)

The Nashville Americans were a minor league baseball team that played in the Class B Southern League from 1885 to 1886. They were located in Nashville, Tennessee, and played their home games at Sulphur Spring Park, later known as Sulphur Dell.

The team was formed on October 6, 1884, as Nashville's first professional baseball team. They played several exhibition games against major league teams that fall at the Nashville Fairgrounds as they sought admission to the Union Association, one of three major leagues at the time. Instead, they were selected as charter members of the Southern League for the next season.

The 1885 Americans were managed at different times by local player Will Bryan, second baseman Nate Kellogg, and local businessman John R. Mayberry. They played well throughout the season and compiled a 62–39 (.614) record, placing third. They spent the majority of the season in either second or third place. Led by left fielder Walt Goldsby, the 1886 team played well but finished in a distant third place with a record of 46–38 (.548).

== History ==
=== Formation ===
Baseball was first played in Nashville, Tennessee, by amateur teams in the late 1860s. By summer 1884, the city was home to countless teams, with an estimated 20 clubs being formed that year alone. The various teams played at fields around town, including East Nashville's Spring Park, the Nashville Fairgrounds, Fort Negley, Vanderbilt University, and Sulphur Spring Bottom.

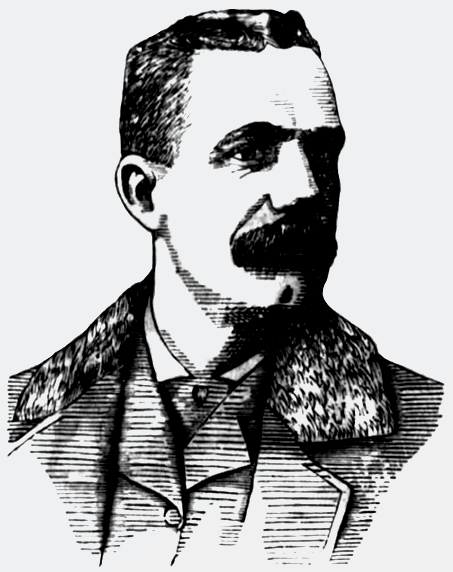
Will Bryan, manager and center fielder of the Americans

On October 6, 1884, the American Baseball Association, a local stock company with US$1,000 in capital, met to establish the city's first professional baseball team. The club was to be known as the Americans in honor of The Nashville Daily American newspaper, which, in addition to the Nashville Banner, provided scores and accounts of the city's many baseball games. Will Bryan, a well-known local player, was selected to manage the team. He promptly left for Cincinnati with instructions to hire first-class players with no regard to their cost.

The Union Association, one of three major leagues in operation in 1884, considered the Americans for membership in the 1885 season. On October 10, President Henry Lucas came to Nashville to meet with the team's directors and to survey the prospect of major league baseball in the city. That afternoon at the fairgrounds, the Americans played their first exhibition game against one of the association's top teams, the Cincinnati Outlaw Reds. Approximately 1,200 to 1,500 people were in attendance as the Outlaw Reds won, 6–3. The Americans were defeated again in the next afternoon's game, 11–2. On October 12, Nashville lost to an amateur team from Georgetown, Kentucky, 4–1. The home team won its only games of the autumn exhibition season on October 19 and 20, defeating the Georgetowns, 6–2 and 9–3. The Louisville Eclipse of the major American Association came to Nashville for two games on November 1 and 2, winning both, 7–6 and 9–7.

On November 7, club directors signed a five-year contract to lease the baseball grounds at Sulphur Spring Bottom on which they would build a ballpark to be called Sulphur Spring Park. Located just north of the Tennessee State Capitol, the site was owned by the Sulphur Spring Company, which used the property for providing hot and cold baths with water from its natural sulphur springs. The land had hitherto been little more than solely a baseball field and required improvements to make it suitable for a professional team. The old bath houses were demolished and replaced with new ones, and the grounds were graded, leveled, sowed with grass, and enclosed by a 15-foot (4.6 m) fence. A grandstand was erected in the northeastern corner of the block near the intersection of Cherry Street (Fourth Avenue North) and Jackson Street.

With the possibility of membership in Union Association looking dim, Bryan attended a meeting of Southern baseball men on November 25 in Montgomery to organize the Southern League for 1885. Though a tentative membership was arranged, the final league makeup was not determined until another meeting on February 11 at the Kimball House in Atlanta, where franchises were granted to Atlanta, Augusta, Chattanooga, Columbus, Macon, Memphis, and Nashville, with Birmingham later admitted from a pool of applicants.

=== Spring training 1885 ===
Bryan's players reported to Nashville to prepare for the coming season, with their first practice being held on March 6. Two of the 10 men who began the season with the Americans had played on major league teams the previous year. Alex Voss, the more experienced of the two, pitched in 34 games for the Kansas City Cowboys and Washington Nationals of the Union Association. Joe Werrick played a few games for the Union St. Paul White Caps. Their spring training regimen consisted of several series of exhibition games against amateur, minor, and major league teams, many of which traveled south to prepare for their seasons in a warmer climate.

In their first two games, held at the not-yet-completed Sulphur Spring Park on March 30 and 31, the Americans lost to the Indianapolis Hoosiers of the minor Western League, 8–4 and 12–4. Nashville defeated the Cleveland Forest Cities of the same league, 15–7 and 3–2, on April 1 and 2. They then traveled to Chattanooga for a game against the Southern League's Chattanooga Lookouts on April 6, losing 6–5. Rain prevented playing a second day's game, but the teams returned to Nashville for two more games on April 8 and 9. Nashville won both, 12–3 and 4–3. Nearly 4,000 people were in attendance at Sulphur Spring Park as the National League's Chicago White Stockings defeated the Americans, 4–2, on April 10. They then played two final warm-up games against an amateur club from Montgomery on April 13 and 14, winning 10–7 and 18–5.

=== The 1885 season ===
The Nashville Americans were scheduled to begin the Southern League championship season of 1885 with a road trip beginning on April 15 at Columbus. Though several players were not placed at their regular positions, the Opening Day roster consisted of pitcher Billy Crowell; catcher James Hillery; first baseman Len Sowders; second baseman Ed McKean; third baseman Joseph Deistel; shortstop Joe Werrick; left fielder George Rhue; center fielders Will Bryan and Tony Hellman; and right fielder Alex Voss.

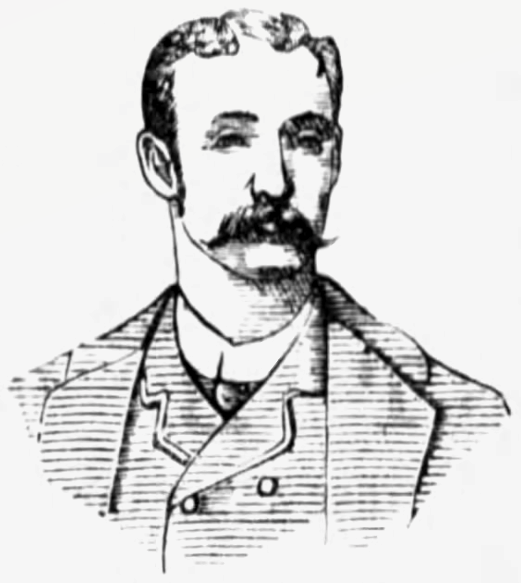
Pitcher Alex Voss had the most major league experience on the Opening Day roster.

Sowders led off the season opener against the Columbus Stars with a double and came home to score on Hillery's base hit and a wild throw to first. Hillery scored later in the first inning, putting Nashville up 2–0. The Americans proceeded to hold the lead for the entire game, with the decisive run being scored by Deistel in the seventh. Nashville won its inaugural regular season game, 11–9. They continued their opening road trip with two more games against Columbus before going on to Birmingham, Macon, and Augusta. In an early move to strengthen the roster, they added outfielder John Cullen to the roster on April 21. The Americans returned home in third place with a record of 7–4 (.636).

The Sulphur Spring Park home opener took place on May 4 against Columbus. In the top of the first, Werrick hit a two-RBI triple scoring Hillery and Cullen, but these were to be Nashville's only runs of the game. Tied 2–2 in the fifth, a bad throw allowed Columbus to score the winning run. Voss pitched well in the 3–2 Nashville loss, allowing only three runs on five hits and striking out four, but opposing pitcher Doc Landis held the Americans to just two runs on five hits. Errors, five by Nashville and four by Columbus, hampered both teams as none of the game's five runs were earned. Down by a significant score in the next day's game, Nate Kellogg, a newly acquired second baseman, moved over to pitch in relief in the 10–2 loss. After a third defeat by Columbus, the Americans got their first home win against the Birmingham Coal Barons, 12–5, on May 9. Hillery led Nashville's offence that day with a single, a double, two triples, and three runs scored. Outfielders Ollie Beard and Lefty Marr, formerly on Chicago's spring training roster, were acquired and made their Americans debut on May 11. Crowell pitched a near no-hitter against Birmingham on May 12, with Al McCauley recording the only hit against him in the 10–0 shutout.

The stockholders of the club made several changes beginning on May 19 in response dissension among the team in the form of negligent play and possible thrown games. Manager Bryan was released before that afternoon's game. Kellogg was selected as manager and team captain on May 20. Beard and Deistel were named first and second assistant captains. McKean and Rhue were also released. The club, at the request of other Southern League teams, which were all named for their respective cities, changed the name of the club to the Nashville Base Ball Association. From that point onward, the local press dropped all references to the "Americans", and the team was usually referred to as simply Nashville or the Nashvilles. On May 30, Toad Ramsey of the visiting Chattanooga Lookouts pitched a no-hitter against Nashville in a game where only three locals reached base, two via walks and one on an error. At the end of the first full month of play, Nashville stood in second place with a 14–11 (.560) record behind Atlanta.

Beginning with the June 3 game at Memphis, telegraph operators began to report in detail the team's road games at the Masonic Theater. They utilized a blackboard bearing the image of a diamond with holes around the edges through which flags would be inserted to indicate each player's performance play-by-play. The presentations were attended by enthusiastic, cheering audiences.

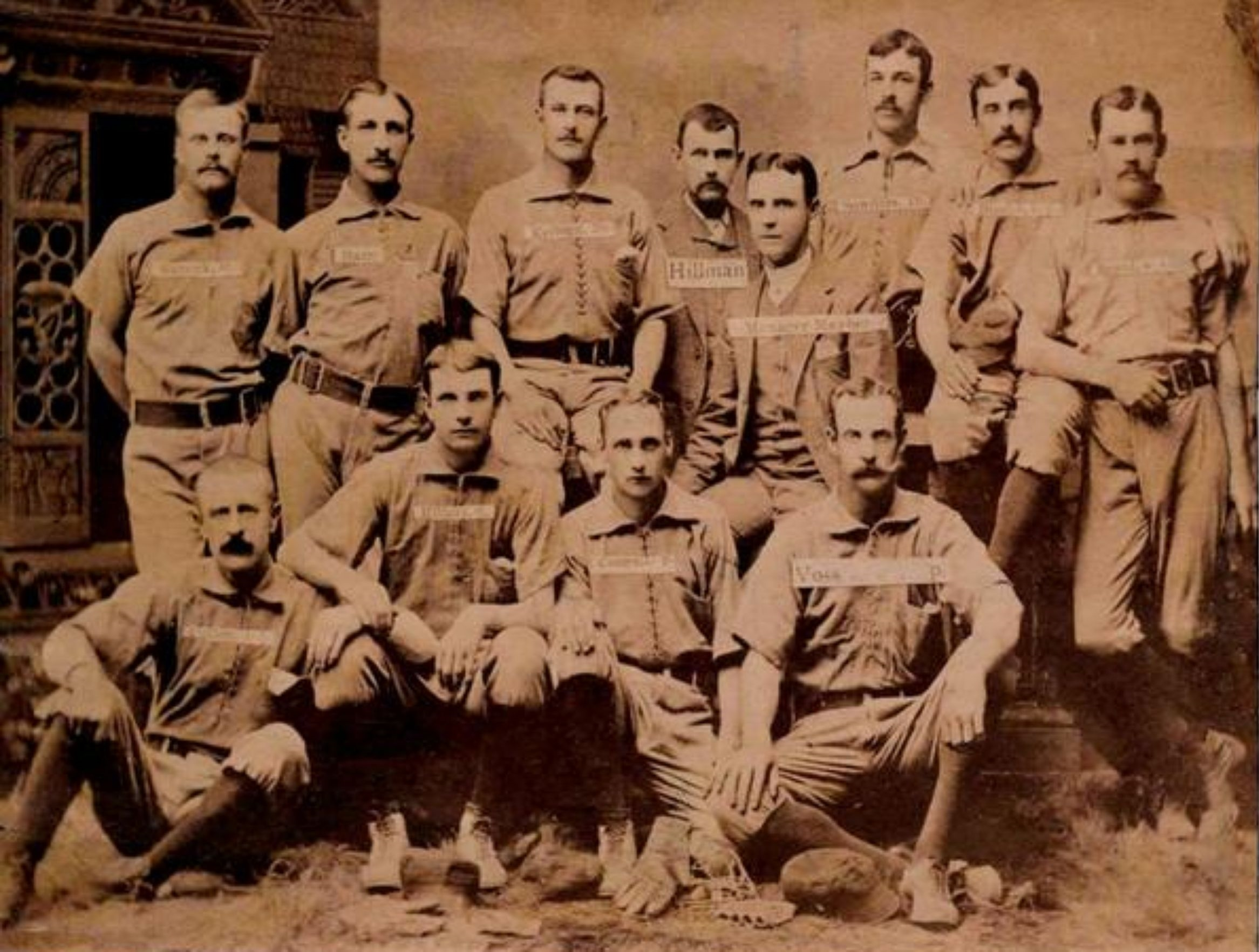
The 1885 Nashville Americans

At the end of the short cross-state trip, Kellogg resigned as manager, feeling overwhelmed by the responsibility in addition to playing and being team captain. John R. Mayberry, a stockholder and businessman in the field of insurance, took control on June 7. Though briefly falling to third place, the Nashvilles played well after the managerial change and retained second by July 3 due in part to a nine-game winning streak from June 17 to 27. Going into Independence Day, nearly the half-way point of the season, they held a 31–19 (.620) record, six games out of first.

Looking to bolster the roster for their run at the pennant, several players were added and subtracted in July. Right fielder John Sneed was added on July 6. Pitcher Gus Shallix made a favorable debut in a July 14 win in which he allowed only two runs on five hits. Some 3,000 people attended an exhibition game against the American Association's Louisville Colonels at Sulphur Spring Park on July 17, which was won by the major leaguers, 9–6. Shallix was released with a sore arm on July 25, and Kellogg was released on July 27. As the Nashvilles continued to chase first-place Atlanta, three more pitchers were acquired. Amateur pitcher William Walton was added on a trial basis on July 29, but, doubting his own ability and unwilling to harm the team, he received his requested release on August 1. Billy Taylor debuted on July 31 when a lone base hit and a fielding error kept his first outing from being a perfect game against Chattanooga. Norm Baker, acquired from Louisville, gave up only two runs on three hits in his first appearance on August 6.

Nashville began what should have been a crucial series on the road against the first-place Atlanta Atlantas on August 13. The Nashvilles were five games out of first and had the potential to make up significant ground on the leaders. The first game was postponed by rain, but Atlanta won the August 14 contest, 6–3. A tragic event occurred in the sixth inning of that game when Atlanta's Lewis Henke collided with Marr as he ran to first base. Marr was reaching for a fumbled ball when Henke's side collided with his head and both fell to the ground. Marr got up and recovered the ball as Henke writhed in pain. He was removed from the game and appeared to be doing better that evening. As the night wore on, however, he grew worse and was attended to by doctors who diagnosed him with a ruptured liver from which he died on the evening of August 15.

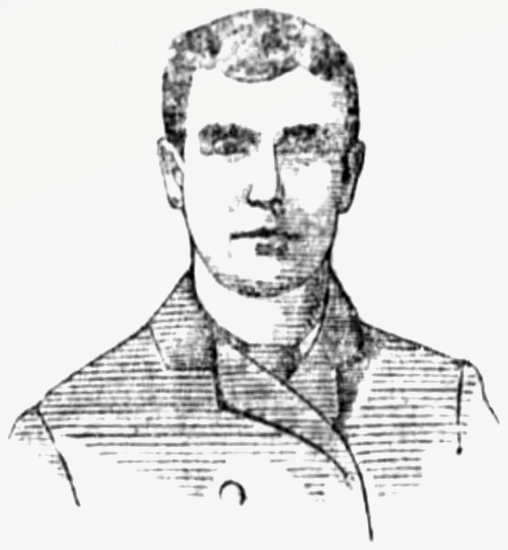
Catcher James Hillery played the entire 1885 season.

Mayberry refused to play the August 15 game against Atlanta on account of actions by the Atlantas and questionable rulings by the umpire in the previous game. Atlanta's pitcher was allowed to play outside the pitcher's box, but Nashville's was not. Additionally, Nashville was disallowed the use of pinch runners for injured players as Atlanta had been in the case of Henke. Displeased with these rulings and questioning the umpire's impartiality, Mayberry planned to return with the team to Nashville. He was later persuaded to play the scheduled game with the promise of fair treatment and the use of a different umpire—dissatisfaction with umpires was rampant across the league. Ultimately, the game was postponed when the severity of Henke's injury was realized. Mayberry and Atlanta manager Gus Schmelz arranged to play an exhibition benefit game for Henke's widow and child at a later date.

Since returning home after the fateful events in Atlanta, the Nashvilles had been handicapped by injuries to Beard, Cullen, and Werrick, yet still won 11 of 13 games through September 1. Crowell had been released on August 20 to reduce the size of the roster. Nashville was encouraged in its chances at the pennant by an 11–3 win in the exhibition benefit game at Atlanta on September 2. With over six weeks of games left to be played, the Southern League was soon to come to an abrupt end.

The collapse began when Birmingham withdrew from the league on September 5 having suffered from poor on-field play and, subsequently, low patronage. Other financially struggling teams were soon to follow. Columbus dropped out on September 7, and it was expected that Chattanooga and Macon would be the next to go. League directors decided to deduct results of some surviving teams' games against Birmingham and Columbus so as to have an even number of series between each club. Macon planned to play until September 15 before disbanding to keep an even record. The modified standings gave Nashville a 57–31 (.648) record, 2 1/2 games behind Atlanta with a month left to play.

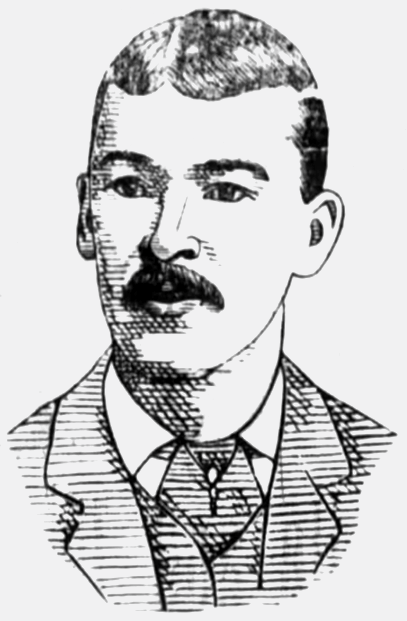
First baseman Len Sowders won the league's first batting title with a .309 batting average.

However, league directors met on September 12 and voted to end the season one month early on September 17. Only Nashville and Memphis voted to continue the season long enough to play out the remaining scheduled games among active teams. The standings and games remaining made it a mathematical impossibility that any team other than Atlanta would win the pennant. The Daily American alleged a scheme on the part of Atlanta and league president Henry W. Grady to ensure the pennant for Atlanta at any cost. Had no games been removed from the record, Nashville and Atlanta would have tie records as of September 13. The newspaper pointed out Atlanta's duplicity in considering to drop out of the league to avoid losing money for each day scheduled against a disbanded club, but simultaneous interest in keeping the team intact for a month's worth of exhibition games. They also cast doubt towards the umpiring as to Atlanta losing only five games on their home grounds. Furthermore, they recalled President Grady predicting that "the Atlantas should win the pennant or he would break up the Southern League."

In the final weeks of competition, Nashville gained second baseman Bill Geiss and left fielder John Murphy of the recently disbanded Birmingham team on September 3. They played their final game of the season, a 3–1 loss at Augusta, on September 17. The pennant was awarded to Atlanta at the league meeting on October 13 in Atlanta. The Nashvilles' final record was 62–39 (.614), placing them in third, 5 1/2 games behind Atlanta. Sowders led all hitters in the league with a .309 batting average, giving him the circuit's first batting title. The Daily American presented Sowders a medal in recognition of his accomplishment.

The majority of the team remained together after the season to get in more practice and play a few exhibition games before the offseason. A few additional players were acquired to make out a full nine. On October 11, they traveled to Louisville where they were shutout by the Colonels, 19–0. Nashville defeated Louisville, 6–2, on October 15, but lost, 10–5, the next day. Their final game was played as a benefit, where all the proceeds went to the remaining members of the team, on October 24. The Nashvilles defeated the Donohues, an amateur club, 5–3. Afterward, players returned to their homes for the winter.

=== Reorganization for 1886 ===
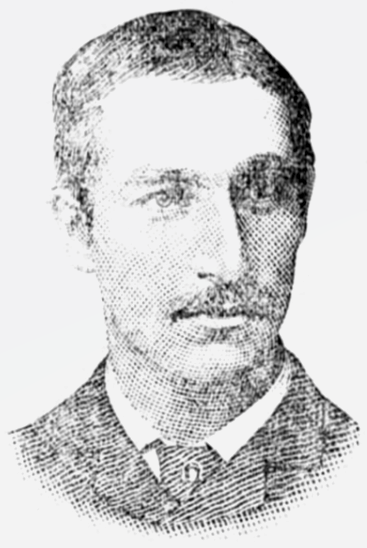
Right fielder Lefty Marr is one of seven Nashvilles to play both seasons.

In preparation for the 1886 season, Southern League team representatives voted to reduce the schedule from six months to five months and require each club to pay a US$500 deposit to guarantee they would play the entire campaign. Membership was to include Atlanta, Augusta, Chattanooga, Macon, Memphis, and Nashville, with Charleston and Savannah later admitted in place of Birmingham and Columbus. Salaries were capped at $1,000 per player with strict penalties of a $1,000 fine for the first offence and expulsion from the league for the second.

Locally, the Nashville Base Ball Association raised its capital to $6,000 to afford the best possible players. Milan Woods was elected president of the board of directors. Walt Goldsby, who played for a trio of American Association teams in 1884 and was acquired to play in Nashville's 1885 postseason games, was selected as the team's manager for 1886. By mid-December, Goldsby had already secured several players for the next campaign. Among these signings were Baker, Beard, Hillery, Marr, and Sowders, who were to return for a second season with Nashville. Goldsby also acquired ex-major leaguers Ed Dundon, Billy O'Brien, and George McVey.

=== Spring training 1886 ===
The team began to assemble in Nashville on March 1 to being practice. In their first exhibition game at Sulphur Spring Park, the Nashvilles defeated the Memphis Grays, 8–0, on March 18. They lost the next afternoon's game, 17–6. In their first competition against a major league team, Nashville defeated the American Association's Pittsburgh Alleghenys, 13–6, on March 22. They then traveled to Memphis for three games from March 23 to 25. Nashville won the first and third games, 10–3 and 20–5, but lost the middle game, 5–4.

Sulphur Spring Park was located in a low-lying area in close proximity to the Cumberland River and prone to regular flooding in the spring. The rising Cumberland prevented the play of further exhibitions against the Louisville Colonels, Pittsburgh, and the Detroit Wolverines. They were able to play the Vanderbilt Commodores at Vanderbilt University, defeating them, 17–8, on April 8. The Nashvilles traveled to Columbia where they won against the city's amateur team on April 10; the score was 14–1 after seven innings when the score was no longer kept. In their final two tuneup games on the road, Nashville defeated the Atlanta Atlantas, 7–6 and 9–4, on April 12 and 13. The Atlanta games were the first of the year to be presented via telegraphed descriptions at the Olympic Theater.

=== The 1886 season ===
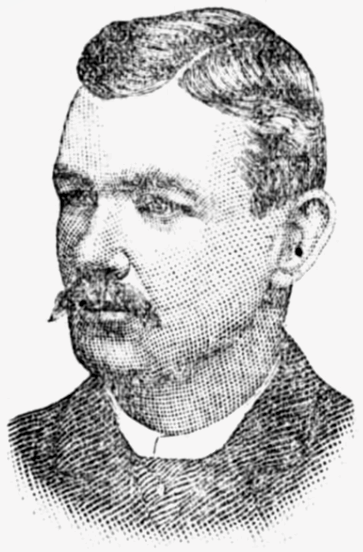
Pitcher Ed Dundon played over 30 major league games prior to joining Nashville.

Nashville's Southern League championship season of 1886 was to begin on April 15 at Augusta. The Opening Day roster consisted of pitchers Norm Baker, Tod Brynan, Ed Dundon, and Mike Smith; catchers Billy Earle, George McVey, and Al Schellhase; first baseman Billy O'Brien; second baseman Henry Bittman; third baseman James Hillery; shortstop Ollie Beard; left fielder/manager Walt Goldsby; center fielder Lefty Marr; and right fielder Len Sowders.

Nashville lost the season opener, 6–3. Following another loss the next day, the team won its first game of 1886 on April 17 against Augusta. They opened the scoring in the second inning and held the lead for the duration of the game. The winning run in the 13–6 victory was scored in the fifth inning when O'Brien drove in Sowders from second base. They completed the first road trip with a 7–8 (.467) record and returned home in fifth place.

Prior to the Sulphur Spring Park home opener on May 8, the Nashvilles and Augustas were paraded from the Maxwell House Hotel through the streets of Nashville to the ballpark. In the 8–0 shutout win, Baker limited the first-place Browns to a single hit while walking one and striking out 12 batters. Catcher Tony Hellman of the 1885 team was reacquired and joined the club on May 15. Brynan was released on May 21, and McVey was released on May 23. By the end of May, Nashville was fluttering between second and third place at 17–15 (.531).

The Nashvilles continued to improve, playing far better than in their opening Southern trip, and moved into a first-place tie with Atlanta on June 7. They took sole possession of the lead on June 9 with a 3–2 win over Memphis and an Atlanta loss to Chattanooga. Following several rain-outs and games prevented by poor field conditions at home, Nashville dropped to second place on June 18 with a loss to Chattanooga and an Atlanta win over Memphis. Earle was released to Memphis on June 11 in exchange for catcher Charlie Krehmeyer who made his Nashville debut on June 18. By July 3, despite several losses and more rain outs, the team remained in second place at 28–21 (.571). Pitcher Billy Taylor of the 1885 team joined on July 5 in a 13–3 defeat of Memphis.

Much like the last campaign, the Southern League would not complete this season intact. On July 7, Augusta forfeited its franchise to the league. Chattanooga, last in the standings, voluntarily dropped out on July 10 to provide the circuit with an even number of teams. On July 11, an off day before the resumption of the league's adjusted schedule, Nashville stood in fourth place at 30–24 (.556); their degrading play and earlier misfortunes with the weather was taking its toll. Poor hitting and injuries incurred by pitchers Baker and Smith were contributing factors to lackluster performance throughout the month. On July 30, Goldsby released Krehmeyer and Smith.

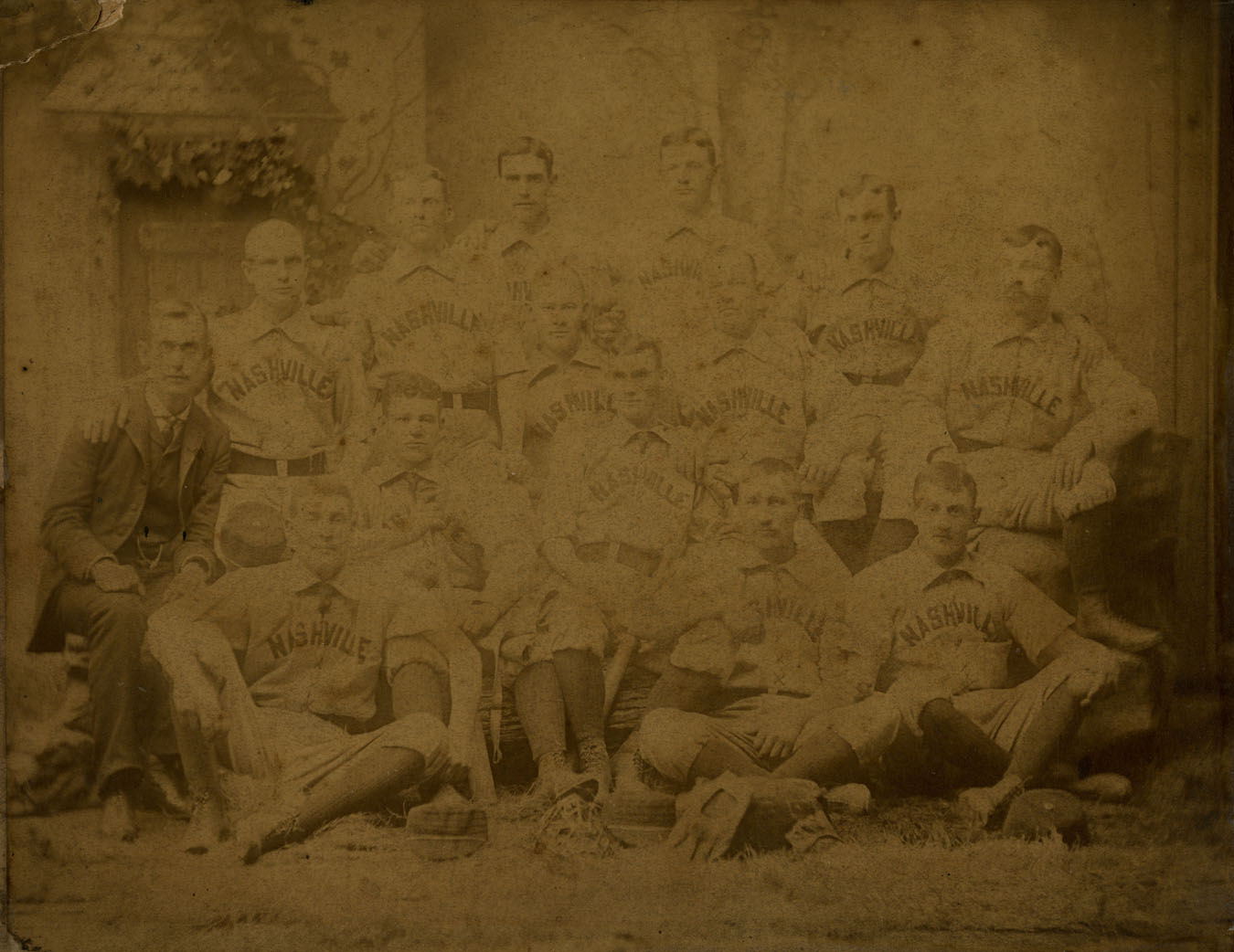
The 1886 Nashville Americans

On August 8, with about one month left in the season, Nashville's pennant hopes were all but faded as they stood in an ever-distant third place, 11 games back, at 36–33 (.522). Amateur pitcher Arthur Saunders joined the team on August 12 to makeup for the dismissal of Taylor on August 7. The Nashvilles defeated the Louisville Colonels, 6–3, in an exhibition game at Sulphur Spring Park on August 17. As the season drew to a close, Baker was given his release so he could sign on with another league on September 1. Nashville played its final game on September 4, losing 10–9 at home against Savannah. After the game, players were paid and the team disbanded. Their final record for the 1886 season was 46–38 (.547), a third-place finish 14 games behind the pennant-winning Atlantas. Marr, mirroring Sowders' feat from the previous season, was the league's batting champion with a .327 average. The Daily American presented him with a medal in recognition of his feat.

Nashville had an average daily attendance of 1,200 people in their second season. Low patronage at the Olympic Theater resulted in a discontinuance of game reporting on July 13. While games and descriptions were liberally patronized in the early goings, attendance lagged as the season wore on and the team fell further in the standings.

Southern League representatives met at the Maxwell House Hotel in Nashville on October 7 to discuss the affairs of the preceding season and lay the groundwork for a more principled league in the next. Nashville was represented by local baseball magnates John Morrow, who was elected president, and William Cherry. The local team fielded in 1887 has come to be known as the Nashville Blues.

== Season-by-season results ==
=== 1885 standings ===
Birmingham dropped out of the Southern League on September 5. They were followed in disbandment by Columbus on September 7. Records for these two disbanded clubs are given as they stood on their last days of competition.

1885 Southern League standings (April 15–September 17)
Team	Games	Won	Lost	Win %	Finish	GB
Atlanta Atlantas	98	66	32	.673	1st	—
Augusta Browns	104	68	36	.654	2nd	1
Nashville Americans	101	62	39	.614	3rd	5 1/2
Macon	102	55	47	.539	4th	13
Memphis Reds	92	38	54	.413	5th	25
Chattanooga Lookouts	94	33	61	.351	6th	31
Columbus Stars	96	49	47	.510	DNF	DNF
Birmingham Coal Barons	94	18	76	.191	DNF	DNF

=== 1886 standings ===
Augusta forfeited its franchise on July 7, and Chattanooga dropped out on July 10 to keep the league with an even number of teams. Their records are given as they stood on their last days of competition.

1886 Southern League standings (April 12–September 4)
Team	Games	Won	Lost	Win %	Finish	GB
Atlanta Atlantas	92	64	28	.696	1st	—
Savannah	85	54	31	.635	2nd	6 1/2
Nashville Americans	84	46	38	.548	3rd	14
Memphis Grays	88	43	45	.489	4th	19
Charleston Seagulls	89	39	50	.438	5th	23 1/2
Macon	88	30	58	.341	6th	32
Chattanooga Lookouts	59	20	39	.339	DNF	DNF
Augusta Browns	51	21	30	.412	DNF	DNF

== Ballparks ==
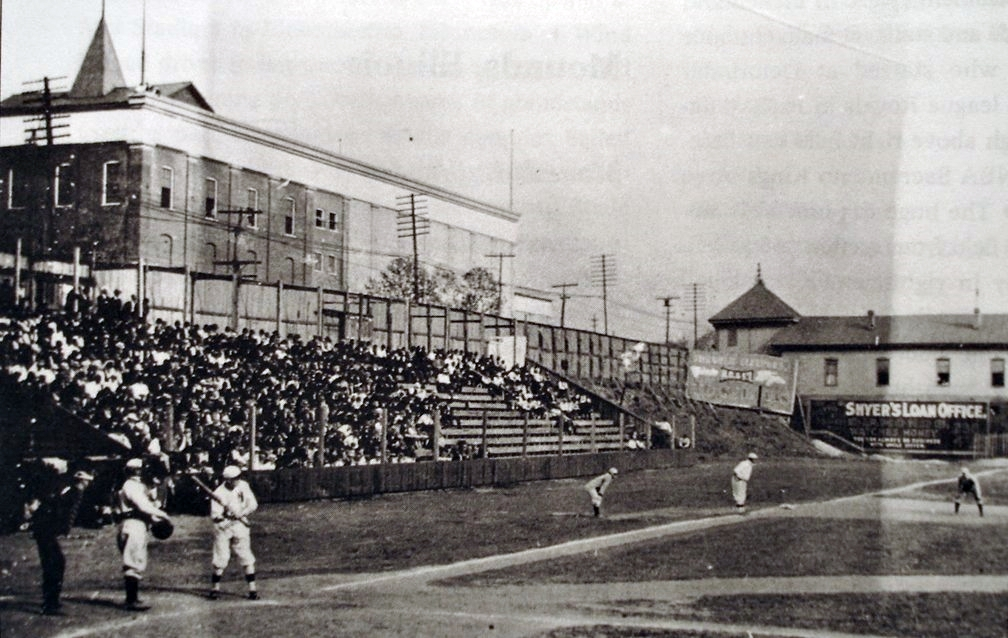
Sulphur Spring Park in 1908

The Americans played their 1884 exhibition games at the Nashville Fairgrounds. Construction began that November on Sulphur Spring Park, their home for the next two seasons. The grandstand was built at the northeastern corner of the block bounded by modern-day Jackson Street, Fourth Avenue North, Harrison Street, and Fifth Avenue North. The main Jackson Street entrance led past the ticket booth and into the grandstand's reserved seats behind home plate and a screen backstop. Rooms for players, directors, scorers, and reporters were built under the grandstand. Restrooms and water fountains, which pumped up sulphur water from the springs below, were also built. The distance to the outfield fence was 362 feet (110 m) to left and right fields and 485 feet (148 m) to center.

Several improvements were made prior to the 1886 season. The first scoreboard was a blackboard on which scores were displayed by writing figures in chalk. It was replaced with a larger board using painted tin squares which hung on hooks. In September 1885, Summer Street (Fifth Avenue) was raised, which necessitated raising the adjacent fence to prevent onlookers. An additional row of boards was placed atop the Jackson Street fence, and a second fence was erected around the entire park inside the existing fence to further prevent unpaid viewing of games over or through the fence. The first base side of the grandstand was covered with a roof.

The facility, known as Sulphur Dell from 1908, was demolished in 1969 after serving as the home of the Nashville Vols from 1901 to 1963. Since 2015, the site has been the location of First Horizon Park, the home stadium of the Triple-A Nashville Sounds baseball team.

== Uniforms ==
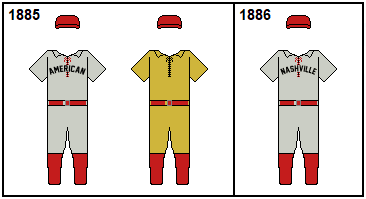
Nashville's uniforms

The Americans wore two sets of uniforms in 1885. Their initial set, per the March 5 edition of The Daily American, consisted of "gray shirts and pants, trimmed with bright red, and having the word "American" across the breast plate. Red stockings and red caps complete the outfit." The lettering was in black. On May 26, just over a month into the season and after dropping the Americans name, they added a second set of shirts and pants made of old gold fabric. The only known photograph of the team shows players wearing light colored short-sleeved jerseys with no markings or insignia, being either the gold uniforms or the grays with the name removed. Light pants terminating below the knees were tucked into dark socks and paired with dark belts and caps. By late August, the team was down to only seven sets of old gold uniforms and often had to mix-and-match articles to assemble a full uniform.

The team's new 1886 uniforms were similar to those worn at the beginning of the previous season. The shirts and pants were made of pearl gray cloth and paired with red caps, belts, and stockings. In the team photograph, players are shown in light shirts, some short-sleeved some long, with "Nashville" on the chest in dark letters, paired with light pants and dark caps, belts, and stockings.

== Players ==
A total of 32 men played in at least one game for Nashville across the 1885 and 1886 seasons. Of these, 24 also played for major league teams during their careers. The 1885 roster consisted of 21 different players, including 15 who also played in the majors at some point. The 1886 roster consisted of 18 different players, including 15 past or future major leaguers. Only seven men played for both iterations of the club, including six major leaguers.

Table key
Position(s)	The player's primary fielding position(s)
MLB	Indicates that a player played in at least one game for a major league team

Positions key
P	Pitcher	SS	Shortstop
C	Catcher	LF	Left fielder
1B	First baseman	CF	Center fielder
2B	Second baseman	RF	Right fielder
3B	Third baseman	OF	Outfielder

1885–1886 Nashville Americans roster
Name	Season(s)	Position(s)	Notes	MLB	Ref.
Norm Baker	1885–1886	P	Joined from Louisville Colonels on August 6, 1885; played remainder of season; On 1886 Opening Day roster; released on September 1	Yes	
Ollie Beard	1885–1886	SS	Joined on May 11, 1885; played remainder of season; On 1886 Opening Day roster; played entire season	Yes	
Henry Bittman	1886	2B	On 1886 Opening Day roster; Played entire 1886 season	No	
Will Bryan	1885	CF	On 1885 Opening Day roster; Released on May 19, 1885	No	
Tod Brynan	1886	P	On 1886 Opening Day roster; Released on May 21, 1886	Yes	
Billy Crowell	1885	P	On 1885 Opening Day roster; Released on August 20, 1885	Yes	
John Cullen	1885	LF	Joined on April 21, 1885; Played remainder of 1885 season	Yes	
Joseph Deistel	1885	CF	On 1885 Opening Day roster; Played entire 1885 season	No	
Ed Dundon	1886	P	On 1886 Opening Day roster; Played entire 1886 season	Yes	
Billy Earle	1886	CF/C	On 1886 Opening Day roster; Released on June 11, 1886	Yes	
Bill Geiss	1885	2B	Joined on September 5, 1885; Played remainder of 1885 season	Yes	
Walt Goldsby	1886	LF	On 1886 Opening Day roster; Played entire 1886 season	Yes	
Tony Hellman	1885–1886	C	On 1885 Opening Day roster; played entire season; Joined on May 15, 1886; played remainder of season	Yes	
James Hillery	1885–1886	3B/OF	On 1885 Opening Day roster; played entire season; On 1886 Opening Day roster; played entire season	No	
Nate Kellogg	1885	2B	Joined on May 5, 1885; Released on July 27, 1885	Yes	
Charlie Krehmeyer	1886	C/OF	Joined on June 18, 1886; Released on July 30, 1886	Yes	
Lefty Marr	1885–1886	RF	Joined on May 11, 1885; played remainder of season; On 1886 Opening Day roster; played entire season	Yes	
Ed McKean	1885	2B	On 1885 Opening Day roster; Released on May 19, 1885	Yes	
George McVey	1886	C	On 1886 Opening Day roster; Released on May 23, 1886	Yes	
John Murphy	1885	LF	Joined on September 5, 1885; Played remainder of 1885 season	No	
Billy O'Brien	1886	1B	On 1886 Opening Day roster; Played entire 1886 season	Yes	
George Rhue	1885	LF	On 1885 Opening Day roster; Released on May 19, 1885	No	
Arthur Saunders	1886	P/LF	Joined on August 12, 1886; Played remainder of 1886 season	No	
Al Schellhase	1886	C	On 1886 Opening Day roster; Played entire 1886 season	Yes	
Gus Shallix	1885	P	Joined on July 14, 1885; Released on July 25, 1885	Yes	
Mike Smith	1886	P	On 1886 Opening Day roster; Released on July 30, 1886	Yes	
John Sneed	1885	RF	Joined on July 6, 1885; Played remainder of 1885 season	Yes	
Len Sowders	1885–1886	1B/CF	On 1885 Opening Day roster; played entire season; On 1886 Opening Day roster; played entire season	Yes	
Billy Taylor	1885–1886	P/1B	Joined on July 31, 1885; played remainder of season; Joined on July 5, 1886; released on August 5, 1886	Yes	
Alex Voss	1885	P/OF	On 1885 Opening Day roster; Played entire 1885 season	Yes	
William Walton	1885	P/RF	Joined on July 29, 1885; Released on August 1, 1885	No	
Joe Werrick	1885	3B	On 1885 Opening Day roster; Played entire 1885 season	Yes	
