= Nate Kellogg =

American baseball player (1858–1923)

- Shortstop
- Born: September 28, 1858; Rochester, Iowa
- Died: July 19, 1923 (aged 64); Brooklyn, New York
- Batted: Left Threw: Right

MLB debut
- August 27, 1885, for the Detroit Wolverines

Last MLB appearance
- September 5, 1885, for the Detroit Wolverines

MLB statistics
- Batting average: .118
- Home runs: 0
- Runs batted in: 0
- Stats at Baseball Reference

Teams
- Detroit Wolverines (1885)

Nathaniel Monroe Kellogg (September 28, 1858 – July 19, 1923) was a Major League Baseball shortstop. He played in five games for the 1885 Detroit Wolverines. He continued to play in the minor leagues through 1891, primarily in the New England League and Northwestern League.

== Sources ==
- Career statistics from Baseball Reference · Baseball Reference (Minors) · Retrosheet · Baseball Almanac
