= John Ewing (baseball) =

American baseball player (1863–1895)

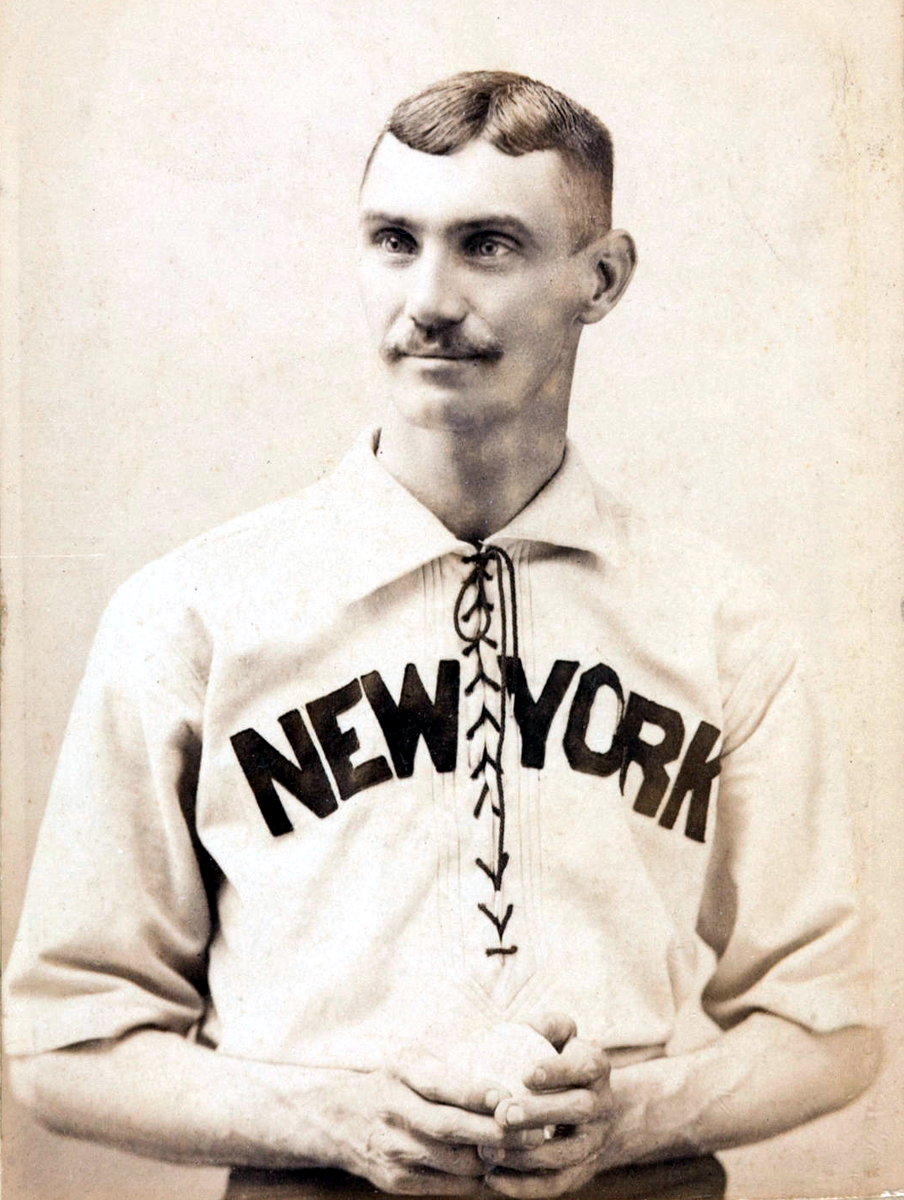
- Pitcher
- Born: June 1, 1863; Cincinnati, Ohio, U.S.
- Died: April 23, 1895 (aged 31); Denver, Colorado, U.S.
- Batted: Right Threw: Right

MLB debut
- June 18, 1883, for the St. Louis Browns

Last MLB appearance
- October 1, 1891, for the New York Giants

MLB statistics
- Win–loss record: 53–63
- Earned run average: 3.68
- Strikeouts: 525
- Stats at Baseball Reference

Teams
- St. Louis Browns (1883); Cincinnati Outlaw Reds (1884); Washington Nationals (1884); Louisville Colonels (1888–1889); New York Giants (PL) (1890); New York Giants (1891)

Career highlights and awards
- NL ERA leader (1891)

John Ewing (June 1, 1863 – April 23, 1895), nicknamed "Long John", was an American professional baseball player. He was a pitcher over four seasons (1888–1891) with the Louisville Colonels, New York Giants of the Players' League, and New York Giants of the National League. Prior to that he was an outfielder in 1883 and 1884. In six years in the major leagues, Ewing played in four different leagues (National League, Union Association, American Association, Players' League).

Ewing compiled a 53–63 career record in 129 appearances, with a 3.68 earned run average and 525 strikeouts. In 1891 he led the National League in ERA (a retroactive ranking; ERA was not tabulated in that era) while playing for New York.

Ewing was used as a first base umpire in an American Association game on August 15, 1889.

He was the brother of Hall of Fame catcher and infielder Buck Ewing. The brothers played on the same team for two seasons, and Buck managed the 1890 Giants team for which John pitched.

Ewing was born in Cincinnati and died in Denver, Colorado at the age of 31.

== See also ==
- List of Major League Baseball annual ERA leaders
