= Monk Cline =

American baseball player (1858–1916)

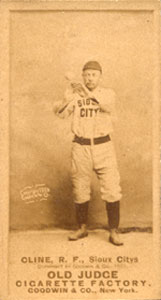
- Outfielder
- Born: March 3, 1858; Louisville, Kentucky, U.S.
- Died: September 23, 1916 (aged 58); Louisville, Kentucky, U.S.
- Batted: Left Threw: Left

MLB debut
- July 4, 1882, for the Baltimore Orioles

Last MLB appearance
- October 14, 1891, for the Louisville Colonels

MLB statistics
- Batting Average: .261
- Home Runs: 2
- RBI: 71
- Stats at Baseball Reference

Teams
- Baltimore Orioles (1882); Louisville Eclipse/Colonels (1884–1885); Kansas City Cowboys (1888); Louisville Colonels (1891)

John P. "Monk" Cline (March 3, 1858 – September 23, 1916) was an American professional baseball player who primarily played outfield in the American Association for the Baltimore Orioles, Louisville Colonels and Kansas City Cowboys.
