= Len Sowders =

American baseball player (1861–1888)

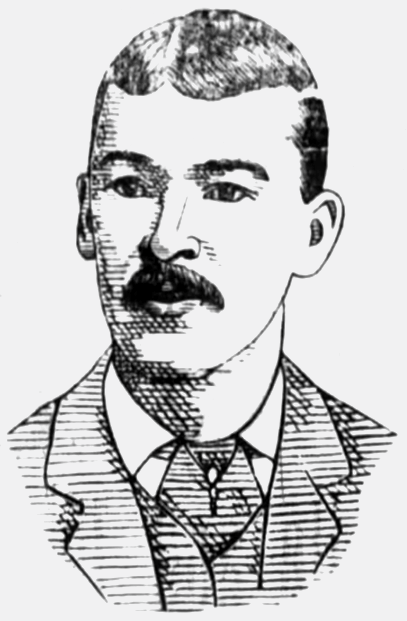
- An illustration from 1885
- Outfielder
- Born: June 29, 1861; Louisville, Kentucky, U.S.
- Died: November 21, 1888 (aged 27); Indianapolis, Indiana, U.S.
- Batted: Left Threw: Left

MLB debut
- September 10, 1886, for the Baltimore Orioles

Last MLB appearance
- October 14, 1886, for the Baltimore Orioles

MLB statistics
- Batting average: .263
- Home runs: 0
- Runs batted in: 14
- Stats at Baseball Reference

Teams
- Baltimore Orioles (1886)

Leonard Sowders (June 29, 1861 – November 21, 1888) was an American Major League Baseball player who played outfield. He played for the Baltimore Orioles of the American Association during the 1886 season. His brothers Bill and John also played professional baseball.

Sowders is buried at Crown Hill Cemetery and Arboretum in Indianapolis, Indiana, Section 37, Lot 8.

== See also ==
- List of baseball players who died during their careers
