= Bolton Street Park =

Ballpark in Savannah, Georgia (1885-1909)

- Location: E Bolton Street; Savannah, Georgia 31401
- Capacity: 2,000 (1904)
- Surface: Grass

Construction
- Renovated: 1894

Tenants
- Savannah (SL) (1886–1887, 1898); Washington Senators (NL) (spring training) (1892); Savannah Electrics (SL) (1893); Savannah Modocs (SL) (1894); Boston Beaneaters (NL) (spring training) (1897); Baltimore Orioles (NL) (spring training) (1899); Baltimore Orioles (AL) (spring training) (1902); New York Giants (NL) (spring training) (1903–1905); Savannah Pathfinders (SAL) (1904–1905); Philadelphia Phillies (NL) (spring training) (1904–1908); Savannah Indians (SAL) (1906–1909)

Bolton Street Park was a baseball field in Savannah, Georgia, which was home to the city's professional baseball clubs between 1885 and 1909, including the Savannah Indians from 1904 to 1909, the Savannah Athletic Association football team, and hosted Major League Baseball spring training between 1892 and 1908 along with Negro league and amateur baseball games. The ballpark was located between Bolton Street and Park Avenue east of the railroad tracks running parallel to East Broad Street.

== History ==
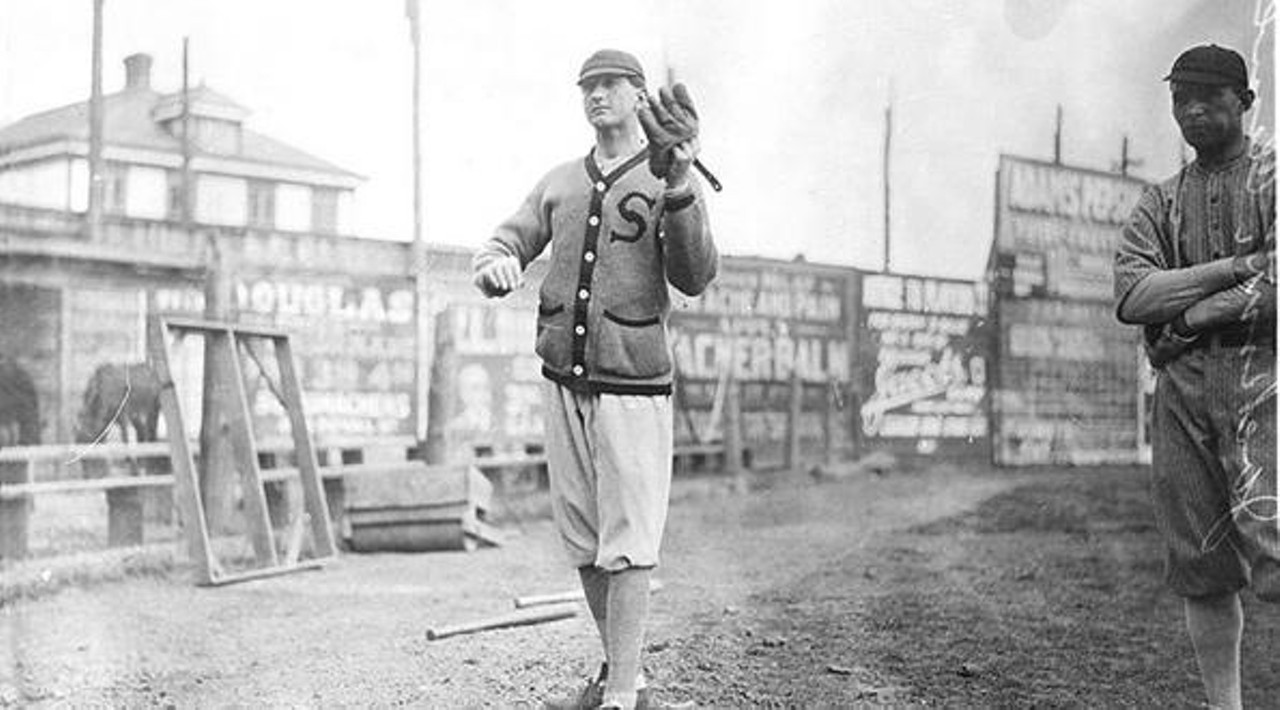
Shoeless Joe Jackson, Savannah Indians, warms up at Bolton Street Park during 1909 season.

The National League Detroit Wolverines beat the Southern Association's Savannah team 4–2 in an exhibition game at Bolton Street Park on March 20, 1886. Savannah and the ballpark hosted multiple Major League baseball teams for spring training between 1892 and 1908. The Washington Senators trained in Savannah at the ballpark in March 1892.

Prior to the 1894 season, Jeff Miller, owner of the Savannah Southern League club, renovated the grandstand to include 500 open chairs, and added a cupola to shield the press, expanded the bleachers, as well as designated areas for carriages and hitching posts.

On November 30, 1893, the Savannah Athletic Association football club welcomed the Georgia Bulldogs football team to Bolton Street. The Atlanta Constitution reported that 3,000 fans turned out for the game which ended in a 0-0 tie. The Red and Black reported that the crowd numbered 5,000. The following year, on November 29, 1894, the Savannah football team welcomed back the Bulldogs to Bolton Street, losing 22 to 0 in front of more than 1,000 spectators whose support was split between the two teams.

Between the 1870s and 1900s, the Chatham Base Ball Club, based in Savannah, was a championship Black baseball club that often played its games at Bolton Street Park. A game on September 7, 1903 between Charleston and Chatham attracted what was reported as the largest crowd of the season to the ballpark, and was noted to include both white and black spectators.

The New York Giants trained at the ballpark in March 1903. On March 21, 1903, the Giants faced a US Army team from nearby Fort Screven on Tybee Island, beating the military team 18-3 with Christy Mathewson pitching two innings.

The site hosted multiple community events including Buffalo Bill's Wild West Show on October 24, 1901, a 1919 BBQ for World War I soldiers, and Field Day Exercises.

The South Atlantic League was formed in November 1903 at the Hotel DeSoto in Savannah. Savannah was one of six charter clubs. On April 26, 1904, Savannah lost to the Charleston Sea Gulls in their first South Atlantic League game before a crowd of 3,200 at the ballpark.

Savannah's football team played at the ballpark to large crowds. Ahead of the December 25, 1903 game against Fort McPherson, concerns were raised about the number of boys who had scaled the fences and gained access to the grounds without paying with as many as 500 having been estimated at the previous game.

Prior to the 1904 baseball season, the Savannah's baseball clubs owners renewed their lease for the year, and upgraded the ballpark by remodeling the grandstand with a new floor and roof, repairing all seating, and adding box seats and protective screening. It was estimated this brought capacity for baseball to 2,000.

In November 1904, the Athletic Association contracted for the addition of 2,000 seats on the north side of the field ahead of the Thanksgiving and New Year's Day games.

== Present site ==
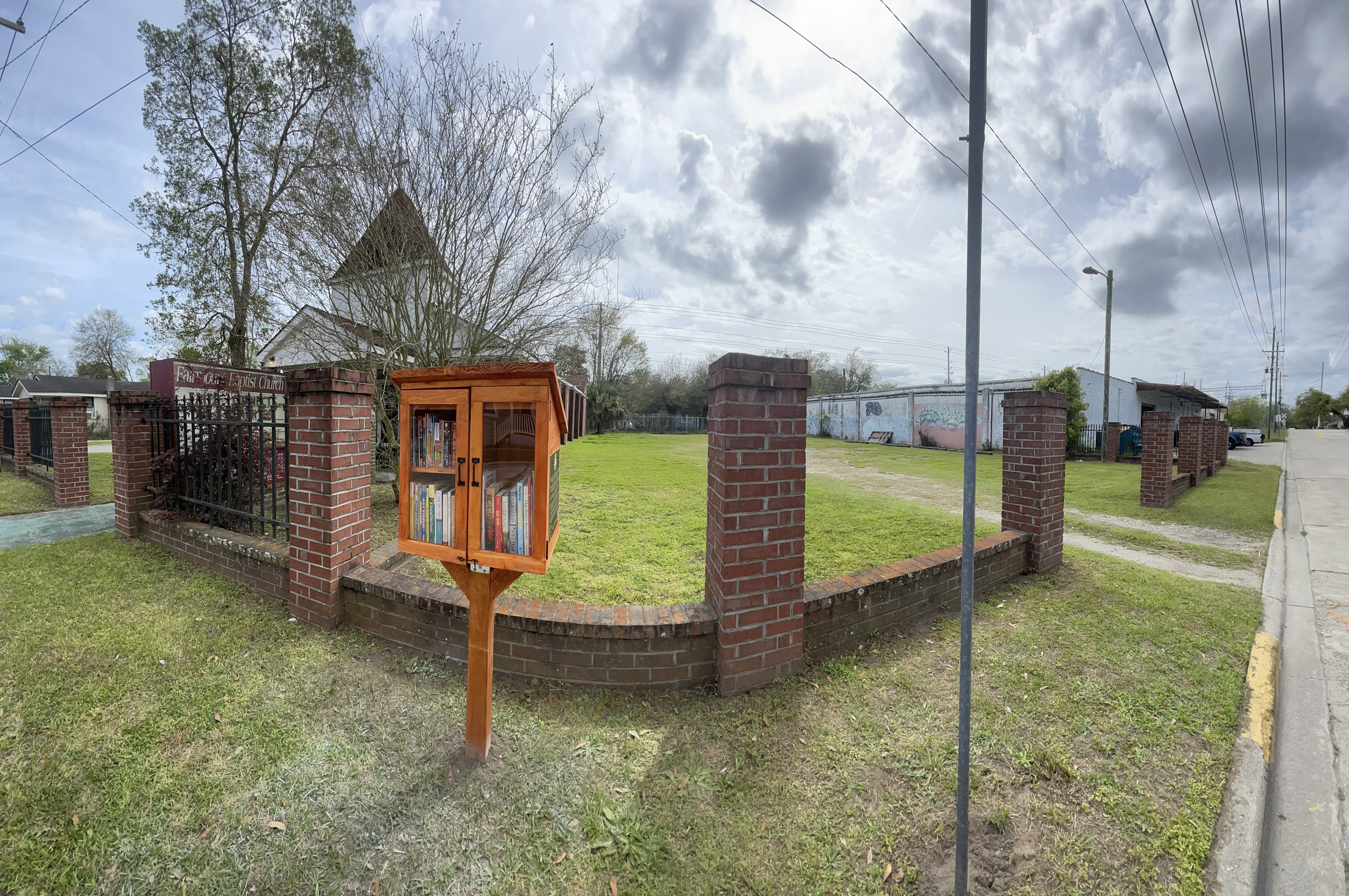
Fairmount Baptist Church and Shoeless Joe Jackson book box at site of former Bolton Street Park (May 2022)

Fairmount Baptist Church had been founded in 1902, and erected its church building at 57th and Waters Streets. The membership acquired the former ballpark site in 1951, and moved its church building to the site at 721 E Bolton Street.

In March 2022, the Shoeless Joe Jackson Museum and Baseball Library opened a community book box at the site of the former Bolton Street Park by Fairmount Baptist Church. Shoeless Joe Jackson had played for the 1909 Savannah Indians and won the league batting title playing his games at Bolton Street Park.
