= Crescent City Base Ball Park =

Stadium in New Orleans, Louisiana

- Interactive map of Crescent City Base Ball Park
- Former names: Sportsman's Park (1886–1887)
- Location: New Orleans, Louisiana
- Coordinates: 29.985°N 90.116°W
- Surface: Grass

Construction
- Opened: 1886
- Renovated: 1888

Tenants
- New Orleans Pelicans (baseball) (1886–1900); Tulane Green Wave (football) (1893–1900)

Crescent City Base Ball Park, originally known as Sportsman's Park (1886–1887), was a sports stadium in New Orleans from 1886 to 1900. The stadium was renamed Crescent City Base Ball Park in 1888 and reopened on February 9, 1888. The ball park was located at City Park Avenue and what is now the Pontchartrain Expressway across from Greenwood Cemetery.

It was home to the New Orleans Pelicans baseball organization from 1887 to 1900. It was also home to the Tulane Green Wave football team from 1893 to 1900.

== See also ==
- New Orleans Pelicans (baseball)
- Tulane Green Wave football
- Sports in New Orleans
