= Memphis Browns =

- 1887; Memphis, Tennessee

Minor league affiliations
- Previous classes: Class B
- Previous leagues: Southern League

Major league affiliations
- Previous teams: Unaffiliated

Team data
- Name: Memphis Browns

The Memphis Browns were a minor league baseball team from Memphis, Tennessee, that played in the Class B Southern League in 1887. The team, one of only three out of seven teams still playing at the end of the season, finished the season in third place with a 65–46 (.386) record.
