= New Orleans Pelicans (baseball) =

New Orleans Pelicans Baseball
- 1887–1977; (1887–1888, 1890, 1892–1896, 1901–1959, 1977); New Orleans, Louisiana

Minor league affiliations
- Class: Triple-A (1977); Double-A (1901–1959)
- League: American Association (1977); Southern Association (1901–1959); Texas-Southern League (1888); Southern League (1887, 1889, 1892–1896, 1898–1899)

Major league affiliations
- Team: St. Louis Cardinals (1977); New York Yankees (1957–1958); Pittsburgh Pirates (1948–1956); Boston Red Sox (1946–1947); Brooklyn Dodgers (1943–1944); St. Louis Cardinals (1940–1942); Cleveland Indians (1930–1939)

Minor league titles
- Dixie Series titles (2): 1933; 1934
- League titles (3): 1932; 1933; 1934
- Pennants (12): 1887; 1889; 1896; 1905; 1910; 1911; 1915; 1918; 1923; 1926; 1927; 1934

Team data
- Name: New Orleans Pelicans
- Ballpark: Louisiana Superdome (1977); City Park Stadium (1958–1959); Pelican Stadium/Heinemann Park (1915–1957); Pelican Park (1908–1914); Athletic Park (1901–1907); Crescent City Base Ball Park/Sportsman's Park (1887–1900)

The New Orleans Pelicans or "Pels" were a minor league professional baseball team based in New Orleans, Louisiana.

== History ==
Founded in 1865 as an amateur social/sporting organization, the Pelicans became a professional franchise when they joined the Southern League in 1887. That league operated off and on until it finally folded in 1899. During that time the team captured three pennants: 1887, 1889, and 1896. The Pelicans then became a founding member of the Southern Association in 1901. From 1887 to 1900, the team played at Sportsman's Park/Crescent City Base Ball Park located at the foot of Canal Street near the New Basin Canal (now the Pontchartrain Expressway).

In 1901, the Pelicans moved to Athletic Park and played there until 1908. After the 1908 season the team moved to Pelican Park, which was located on South Carrollton Avenue, across from present-day Jesuit High School. In 1914, the Pelican Park wooden grandstand was moved by mule teams a quarter-mile down South Carrollton Avenue to the intersection with Tulane Avenue in Mid-City New Orleans. From 1915 through 1936 the facility was known as Heinemann Park after Alexander J. Heinemann, a shareholder in the club and owner of the stadium. The name was changed in 1936 to Pelican Stadium following the death of Heinemann and team owner Charles Somers. The Pelicans played their final game there in 1957. After this, they played for two years at City Park Stadium, now called Tad Gormley Stadium, in City Park. The franchise was sold to Little Rock at the end of the 1959 season. The Southern Association folded after the 1961 season.

The Pelicans won the Dixie Series, a postseason interleague championship between the champions of the Southern Association and the Texas League, in 1933 and 1934.

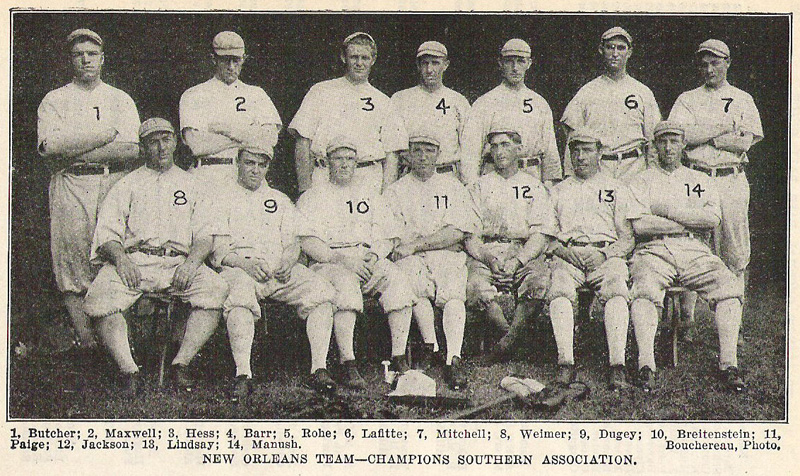
The 1910 Pelicans, Southern Association Champions. #12, Shoeless Joe Jackson, was about to go on to fame in the majors.

Notable Pelicans included Shoeless Joe Jackson, Jimmy Dygert, Henry "Cotton" Knaupp, Bill Lindsay, Zeke Bonura, Gene Freese, and Hall of Famers Dazzy Vance, Joe Sewell, Bob Lemon, and Earl Weaver. In Jackson's only season with New Orleans (1910), he hit .354 to win the league batting title and led the team to the pennant with an 87–53 record. The following year, he would hit .408 with the American League's Cleveland Naps.

In the 1950s, the team was associated with the Pittsburgh Pirates and was managed by Danny Murtaugh. Other notable Pelican managers included Larry Gilbert and Abner Powell, with the latter credited with introducing the perforated "rain check" in 1889.

The Pelicans' name briefly resurfaced during the 1977 season when oilman A. Ray Smith moved his Triple-A Tulsa Oilers to New Orleans to play in the Superdome. Tony La Russa was a reserve infielder for the team, playing most of his games at 2nd base. After a single season, the team then moved to Springfield, Illinois, and was renamed the Redbirds.

== Name revival ==
On December 4, 2012, it was reported that Tom Benson, owner of the NFL's New Orleans Saints and the NBA's New Orleans Hornets, would be changing the Hornets' official name to the Pelicans, possibly as early as the 2013–2014 NBA season.

These reports were officially confirmed on January 24, 2013, when the newly branded Pelicans officially announced the name change and unveiled accompanying logos and a blue, gold and red color scheme. One year later, the Hornets name, logo and color scheme were reclaimed by the new expansion Charlotte Hornets. The previous basketball Hornets originated in Charlotte, North Carolina, before relocating to New Orleans in 2002.

== Affiliations ==
The Pelicans were affiliated with the following major league teams:

Year	Affiliation(s)
1930–39	Cleveland Indians
1940–42; 1977	St. Louis Cardinals
1943–44	Brooklyn Dodgers
1946–47	Boston Red Sox
1948–56	Pittsburgh Pirates
1957–58	New York Yankees

Preceded by Louisville Colonels	Boston Red Sox; Double-A affiliate 1946–1947	Succeeded by Birmingham Barons
