= Memphis Grays =

- 1886–1888; (1886, 1888); Memphis, Tennessee

Minor league affiliations
- Previous classes: Class B
- Previous leagues: Southern League

Major league affiliations
- Previous teams: Unaffiliated

Minor league titles
- Pennants (1): 1894

Team data
- Name: Memphis Grays

The Memphis Grays were a minor league baseball team from Memphis, Tennessee, that played in the Class B Southern League in 1886 and 1888. The team finished the 1886 season in fourth place with a 43–46 (.483) record. In 1888, the team finished second with a 26–24 (.520) record.
