= Cincinnati Kelly's Killers all-time roster =

List of baseball players

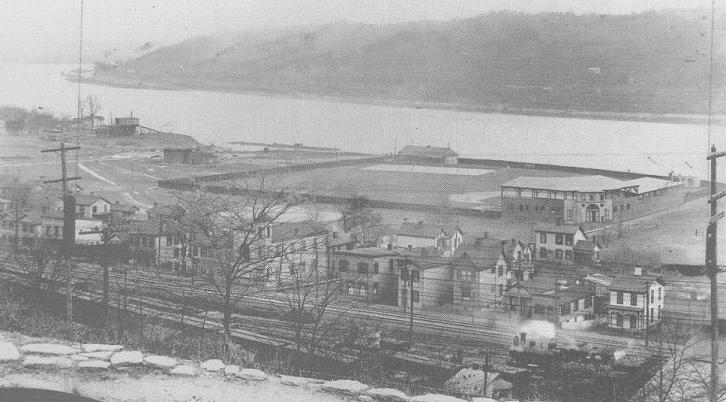
East End Park, The Home of the Cincinnati Kelly's Killers.

The Cincinnati Kelly's Killers were a Major League Baseball franchise based in Cincinnati. The team existed for one season, 1891, and played in the American Association (AA). The team played their home games at East End Park.

The majority owner of the club was Chris von der Ahe, who also owned the St. Louis Browns of the American Association, and they were managed by King Kelly. In mid-August with the season incomplete, while the club was playing a series in St. Louis, von der Ahe was paid $12,000 by the National League's Cincinnati Reds to move the team out of the Cincinnati area. The club was folded and replaced for the remainder of the 1891 season by the Milwaukee Brewers, who were brought in from the Western League. Kelly's Killers had a win–loss record of 43–57.

== Keys ==
Abbreviations
Name	Name of the player by official records
Position	Position that player played in the field
Seasons played	The seasons played for this franchise by the player
† §	Indicates the player was both a player-manager and Hall of Famer

Position
C	Catcher	1B	First baseman
2B	Second baseman	3B	Third baseman
SS	Shortstop	IF	Infielder
LF	Left fielder	CF	Center fielder
RF	Right fielder	OF	Outfielder
SP	Starting pitcher	RP	Relief pitcher

== List of players ==
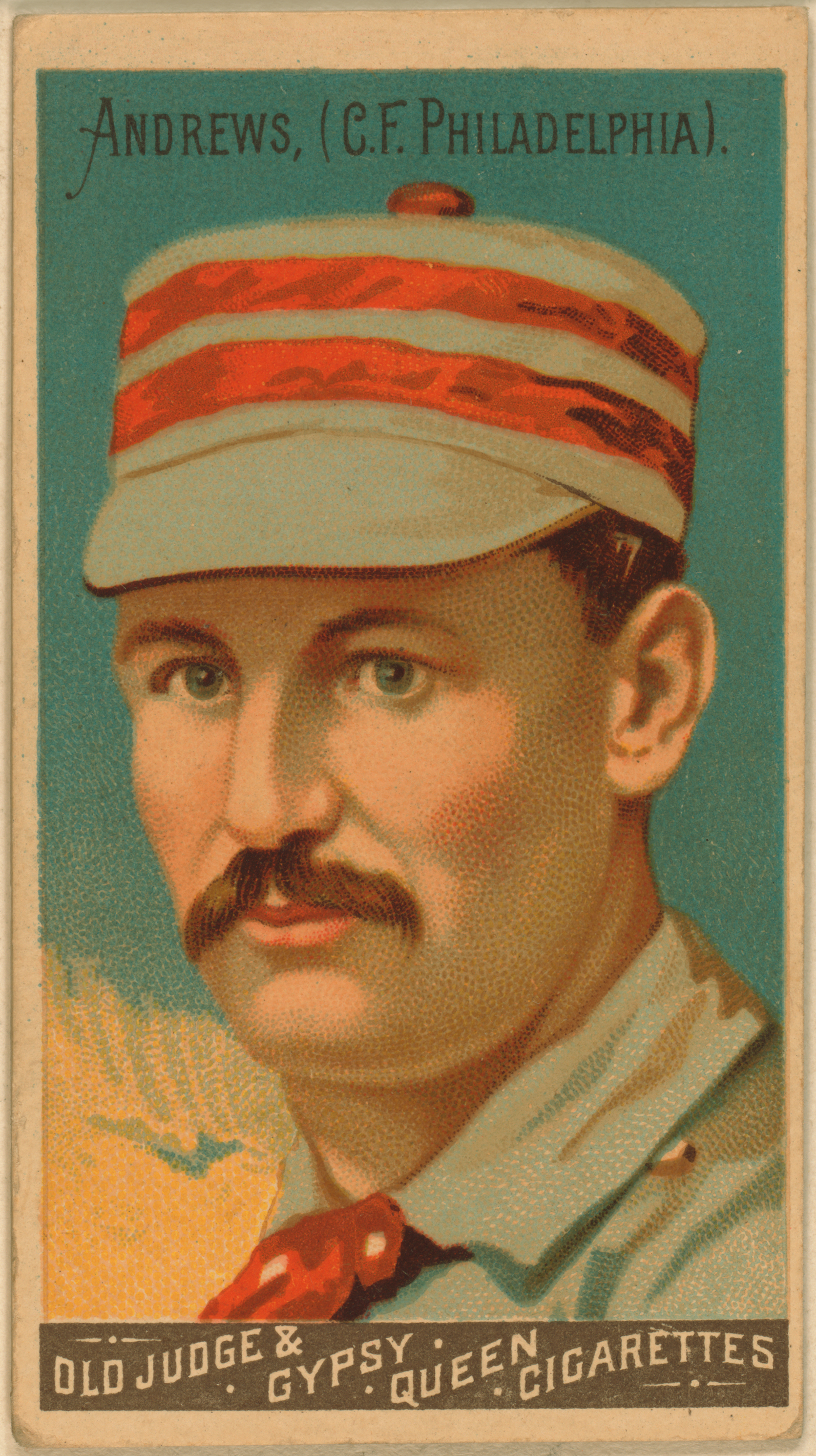
Left fielder Ed Andrews

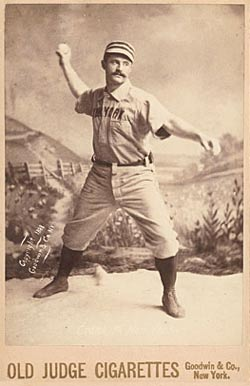
Pitcher Ed Crane

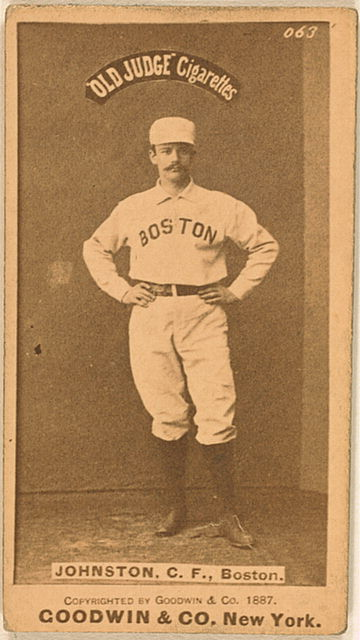
Center fielder Dick Johnston

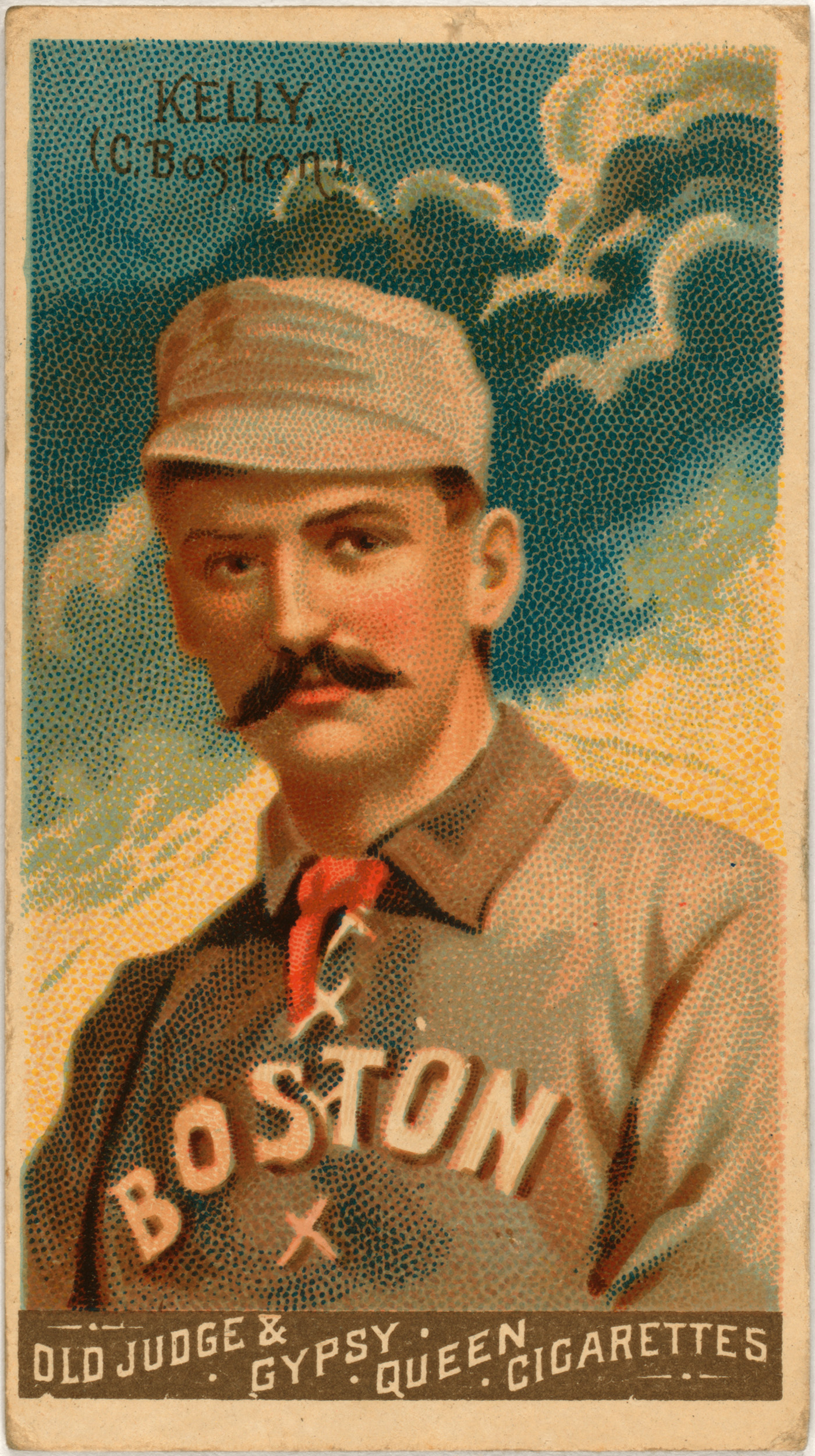
Catcher/Manager King Kelly

Player	Position	Seasons	Notes	Ref
Ed Andrews	LF	1891	Andrews was the starting left fielder, and batted .211 in 83 games played.	
Charlie Bastian	2B	1891	Bastian played 1 game at second base.	
Charlie Bell	SP	1891	Bell pitched 1 game for the Killers, a complete game win, and collected 2 hits in 4 at bats. It was his last game in the major leagues.	
Joe Burke	2B	1891	Burke played 1 game at second base, his last game in the major leagues.	
Jim Canavan	SS	1891	Canavan led the team with 101 games played, as well several hitting categories, such as: runs scored, triples, home runs, and RBIs.	
John Carney	1B	1891	Carney played first base, and batted .278 in 99 games played. When the Killers folded, he played for the Milwaukee Brewers, his last season in the major leagues.	
Billy Clingman	2B	1891	Clingman played 1 game at second base.	
Ed Crane	SP	1891	Crane pitched in 32 games, and had a win–loss record of 14–14, and a 2.45 earned run average.	
Frank Dwyer	SP	1891	Dwyer pitched in 35 games, and had a win–loss record of 13–19, and a 4.52 earned run average.	
Jerry Hurley	C	1891	Hurley played in 24 games, and had a .212 batting average. It was his last season at the major league level.	
Dick Johnston	CF	1891	Johnston had 6 home runs, 51 RBIs, and a .212 batting average in 1891, his last season in the major leagues.	
Kid Keenan	SP	1891	Keenan pitched 1 game for the Killers, a complete game loss, and collected 2 hits in 4 at bats. It was his only game in the major leagues.	
King Kelly^{†} ^{§}	C / IF	1891	Kelly was the catcher and manager for the Killers. He played in 82 games, and batted .297. He finished the season with the Boston Reds, also of the AA.	
Matt Kilroy	SP	1891	Kilroy pitched in 8 games, and had a win–loss record of 1–4, and a 2.98 earned run average.	
Willard Mains	SP / RP	1891	Mains pitched in 30 games, and had a win–loss record of 12–12, and a 2.69 earned run average.	
Lefty Marr	RF	1891	Marr played in 14 games, and batted .248. It was the last season he played in the major leagues.	
Willie McGill	SP	1891	McGill pitched in 8 games, and had a win–loss record of 2–55, and a 4.98 earned run average.	
Yank Robinson	2B	1891	Robinson played all his 97 games at second base, and had a .178 batting average.	
Emmett Seery	RF	1891	Seery played in 97 games, and had a .285 batting average.	
John Slagle	RP	1891	Slagle pitched in 1 games, an inning and a third of relief. He allowed no runs to score.	
Farmer Vaughn	C	1891	Vaughn played in 55 games, and had a .257 batting average.	
Art Whitney	3B	1891	Whitney played in 97 games, and had a .199 batting average.	
Wild Bill Widner	SP	1891	Widner pitched 1 game for the Killers, a complete game loss, and collected 1 hits in 4 at bats. It was his last game in the major leagues.	

== See also ==
- Cincinnati Kelly's Killers
- 1891 Cincinnati Kelly's Killers season
