= Play Ball =

Play Ball may refer to:

== Film and television ==
- Playball (film), a 2008 film directed by Alfonso Rodríguez
- Play Ball (serial), 1925 film by Spencer Gordon Bennet believed to be lost
- "Play Ball!", an episode in the fourth season of the children's television show Barney & Friends
- "Play Ball" (Most Dangerous Game), a 2023 television episode
- "Play Ball" (Quantum Leap), a 1991 television episode
- Play Ball (film), a 1937 short film
- Play Ball (1933 film), a Willie Whopper cartoon

== Literature and publishing ==
- Play Ball (manga), Akio Chiba's 1970s manga, later adapted to anime form
- Play Ball: Stories of the Ball Field, King Kelly's 1888 autobiography

== Theatre ==
- Play Ball, an alternative name for play Chicago

== Music ==
- "Play Ball" (song), a 2014 song by AC/DC
- "Play Ball" (プレイ・ボール), a 2002 song by Hikaru Utada from the album Deep River

== See also ==
- Ball Play (disambiguation)
