= Jack Keenan (baseball) =

American baseball player (1869–1909)

Kid Keenan
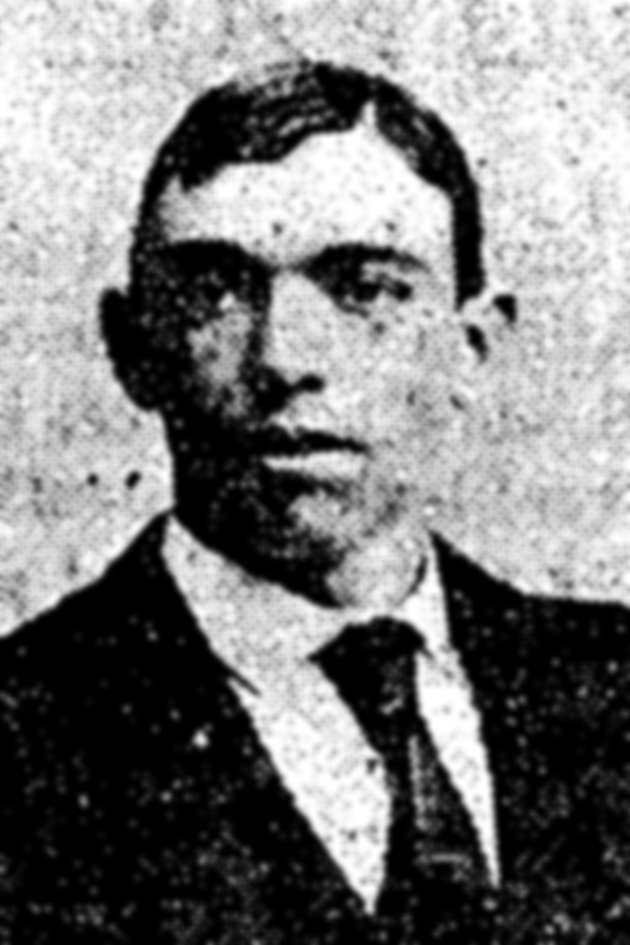
- Pitcher
- Born: January 1, 1869; Louisville, Kentucky, U.S.
- Died: December 21, 1909 (aged 40); Covington, Kentucky, U.S.
- Batted: unknown Threw: Right

MLB debut
- August 11, 1891, for the Cincinnati Kelly's Killers

Last MLB appearance
- August 11, 1891, for the Cincinnati Kelly's Killers

MLB statistics
- Win–loss record: 0–1
- Earned run average: 0.00
- Strikeouts: 5
- Stats at Baseball Reference

Teams
- Cincinnati Kelly's Killers (1891)

John M. Keenan (January 1, 1869 – December 21, 1909), or Kid Keenan, was an American Major League Baseball pitcher. He pitched one game for the Cincinnati Kelly's Killers of the American Association on August 11, 1891. It would be a 9–3 loss to the Boston Reds at East End Park. While he was signed to play for Cincinnati, and went on the road to St. Louis with them, the team was disbanded before he could play in any other games. After his brief Major League appearance, he pitched from 1893 to 1899 in the minor leagues.
