= Cincinnati Reds (disambiguation) =

The Cincinnati Reds are a current Major League Baseball team based in Cincinnati, Ohio, U.S.

Cincinnati Reds may also refer to:

- Cincinnati Red Stockings, the first openly all-professional baseball team, playing in the National Association of Base Ball Players from 1866 to 1870
- Cincinnati Reds (1876–1879), a team that played in the National League from 1876 to 1879
- Cincinnati Outlaw Reds, a team that played in the Union Association in 1884
- Cincinnati Kelly's Killers, a team that played in the American Association in 1891, which is called in some sources the "Cincinnati Reds"
- Cincinnati Reds (NFL), a National Football League team that played in 1933 and 1934
