= East End, Cincinnati =

Coordinates: 39°6′N 84°26′W

East End
- Neighborhood of Cincinnati
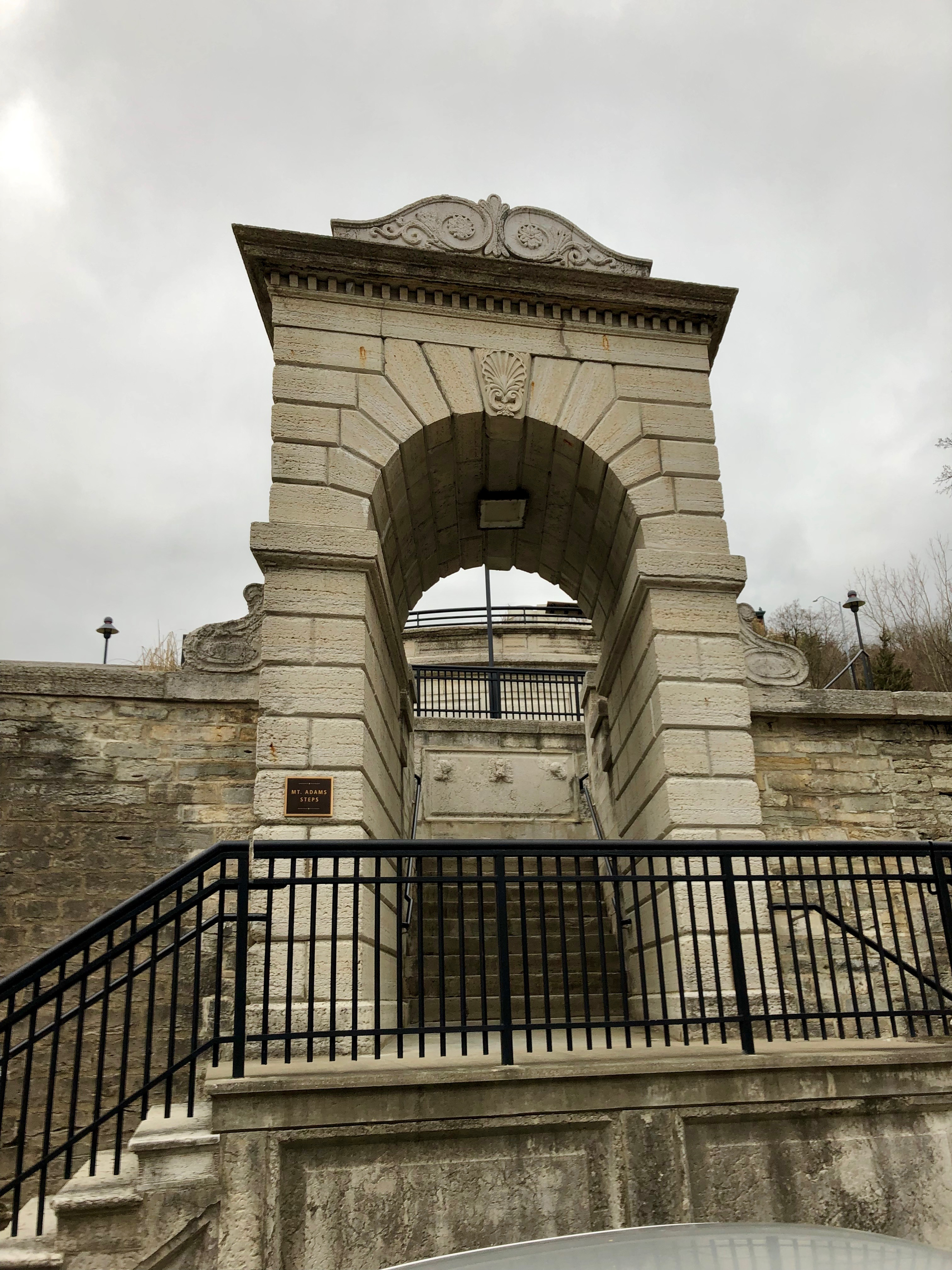
- The Mount Adams Steps in East End, Cincinnati

- Flag

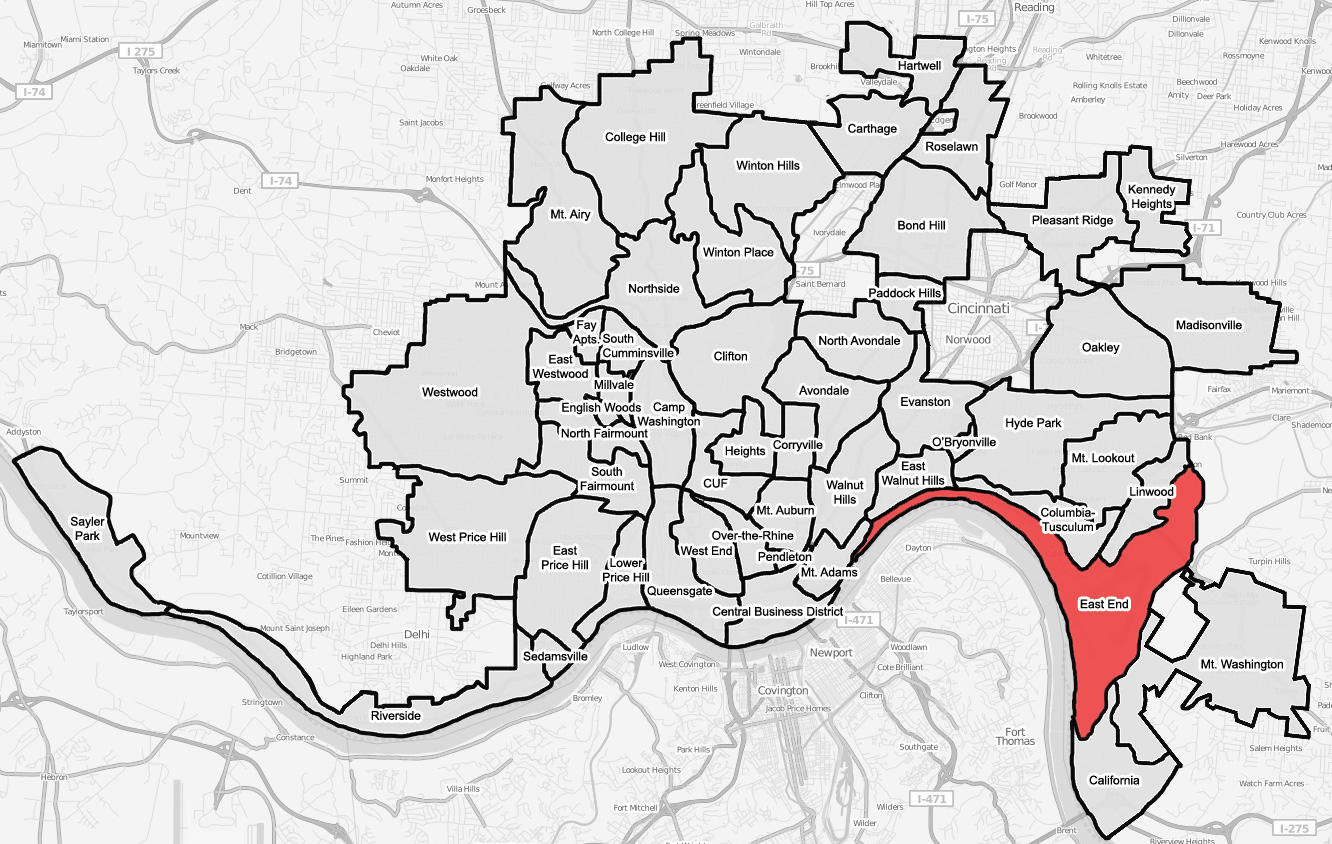
- East End (red) within Cincinnati, Ohio
- Country: United States
- State: Ohio
- County: Hamilton
- City: Cincinnati

Population (2020)
  - Total: 1,476
- Postal code: 45229

East End is one of the 52 neighborhoods of Cincinnati, Ohio. The neighborhood, a 7-mile (11 km) strip along the Ohio River, once held Cincinnati's manufacturing district. It is the location of the Cincinnati Municipal Lunken Airport and Columbia Parkway. The population was 1,476 at the 2020 census.

== History ==
The East End was home of the short-lived East End Park in the 1890s.

== Demographics ==
As of the census of 2020, there were 1,476 people living in the neighborhood. There were 861 housing units. The racial makeup of the neighborhood was 84.1% White, 9.3% Black or African American, 0.0% Native American, 1.3% Asian, 0.0% Pacific Islander, 0.3% from some other race, and 4.9% from two or more races. 2.2% of the population were Hispanic or Latino of any race.

There were 703 households, out of which 57.9% were families. 33.7% of all households were made up of individuals.

13.6% of the neighborhood's population were under the age of 18, 67.9% were 18 to 64, and 18.5% were 65 years of age or older. 50.9% of the population were male and 49.1% were female.

According to the U.S. Census American Community Survey, for the period 2016-2020 the estimated median annual income for a household in the neighborhood was $84,542. About 11.5% of family households were living below the poverty line. About 54.8% had a bachelor's degree or higher.

== Notable people ==
- Jonathan Good, professional wrestler known as Jon Moxley and Dean Ambrose.
- Ruth Lyons, radio and television broadcaster
