= Ball Play =

Ball Play or Ballplay may refer to:

- Ballplay, Alabama
- Ballplay, Monroe County, Tennessee
- Ball Play, Polk County, Tennessee
- Ball Play Creek, in Georgia, US
- The Ball (play), a comedy by James Shirley, first performed in 1632
