= Pecks Mill Creek =

Stream in Georgia, U.S.

Coordinates: 34°32′09″N 83°55′17″W

Pecks Mill Creek is a stream in the U.S. state of Georgia. It is a tributary to the Chestatee River.

Pecks Mill Creek was named after a watermill along its course. A variant name was "Ball Play Creek". This former name was a reference to Indigenous North American stickball.
