= East End Park (Cincinnati) =

Baseball stadium in Cincinnati, Ohio

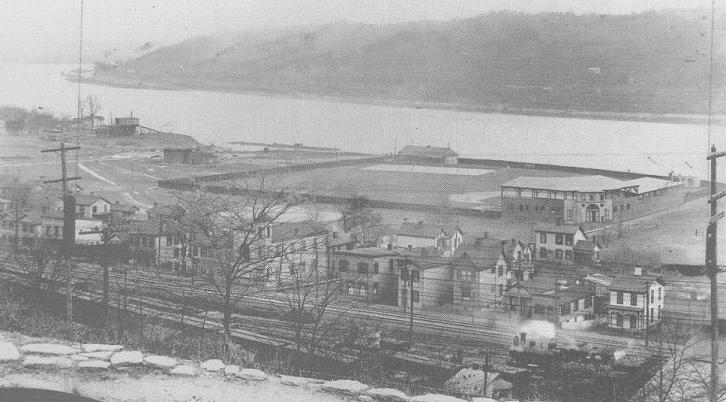
- Interactive map of East End Park
- Former names: Pendleton Park, East End Grounds, and Association Park
- Location: Ridgeley Street, Humbert Street, Babb Alley & Watson Street in Cincinnati, Ohio
- Coordinates: 39°7′5″N 84°26′48″W
- Owner: Cincinnati Kelly's Killers
- Operator: Cincinnati Kelly's Killers
- Capacity: 5,000
- Surface: Grass

Construction
- Groundbreaking: 1891
- Opened: April 25, 1891
- Closed: August 13, 1891
- Demolished: Unknown
- Architect: Al Marcus

Tenants
- Cincinnati Kelly's Killers (AA) (1891); Cincinnati Bearcats (NCAA) (1891-1893)

East End Park was a former major league baseball park located in the East End neighborhood of Cincinnati in the United States. The ballpark, which is also known to baseball historians as Pendleton Park, was home to the Cincinnati Reds of the American Association (now more commonly known as the Cincinnati Kelly's Killers) during the 1891 baseball season. The club was led by the flamboyant star, Mike "King" Kelly.

== The Reds clubs of 1891 ==
The east side Reds had no relationship to the current Cincinnati Reds team. Those Reds had transferred from the Association to the National League in 1890. With the League and the Association on bad terms following several years of peace and Players' League stress of 1890, the Association decided to field a team of its own in Cincinnati for 1891.

This peculiar situation gave the city of Cincinnati two major league baseball teams in the same year with the same nickname. The National League Reds, who played on the west side of Cincinnati; and the Association Reds who played on the east side. Adding to the confusion was the presence of another Reds team in the Association, the Boston Reds. All of these Reds teams derived their nicknames, indirectly, from the original Cincinnati Red Stockings of 1869–1870.

The east side Reds team has also been referred to as Kelly's Killers and the Cincinnati Porkers, as well as Kelly's Wonders, Kelly's Braves and Kelly's Hustlers. Some historians have extended the best known of these informal names by calling them the "Cincinnati Kelly's Killers". However, the Cincinnati papers who covered the team in 1891 only occasionally referred to the club by any of these nicknames.

== Pendleton Park / East End Park ==
Original proposal

Kelly's search for a suitable playing field led him to what was then the far east end of the city, in a picturesque location along the Ohio River that was known as Pendleton Park or Pendleton Grounds. The club secured a lease and built a small ballpark within Pendleton Park, which was dubbed East End Park by the media.

The location of the park was just off Eastern Avenue (now called Riverside Drive), where the Schmidt Recreation Complex is currently located. The ballpark was located between modern day Humbert Street (southwest, right field); Babb (or Babby) Alley (northeast, some distance beyond third base); Watson Street (southeast, left field); and Ridgeley Street (northwest, first base). Ridgeley street now dead ends at Babby Alley but it once extended the distance of the third base bleachers. The diamond was situated toward the northwest (or actually north-northwest) corner of the block.

Just south of Humbert is the Ohio River. Many patrons attending east end Reds games were dropped off by steamboat, coming either from the city or from Coney Island. East End Park was one of only a handful of major league parks to have access by way of a river.

== The Reds Were Blue on Sundays ==
At the time, the National League did not allow Sunday baseball games to be played. As a result, the rival American Association capitalized on this by having their teams play Sunday games. However, the Cincinnati Association club had difficulty with this because the city had the blue law in place which also disallowed Sunday games. Owners of the Cincinnati Reds made repeated attempts at playing games on Sundays. Sometimes the Mayor of Cincinnati, Mayor John B. Mosby, would enforce the law and other times he would not. When the Mayor did enforce the law, the Reds and their opponents found themselves in jail.

In one instance, before a game played on May 24 against the Philadelphia Athletics, the Chief of Police behaved like a Colonel in the US Army. Dressed in a full military uniform, Chief Dietsch had seventy-five of his police officers march back and forth on the baseball field prior to game time to try to intimidate the baseball club. He even went as far as to have seventy-five more police officers waiting at the station if the Reds attempted to play. The players went ahead and attempted to play anyway. When the game entered the second half of the first inning, Chief Deitsch had enough and had his officers arrest all of the players. The next day the Cincinnati Commercial Gazette reported that "It would be commendable in Chief Deitsch if he would display as much zeal in closing saloons and shutting off a few of the crap games that he has shown in stopping Sunday base ball."

== Demise of Mike Kelly's "Killers" ==
The first game at the ballpark was played on April 25, 1891 against Louisville in front of 5,000 fans with the Reds falling 11 to 9. It was reported that the film was not yet in good condition.

As predicted by an Enquirer reporter on March 14, 1891, the east side Reds ballpark proved to be too remote for drawing fans consistently and as a result the club did not fare very well at the box office. During a day off on August 17, it was decided to suspend operations of the franchise until a new ballpark could be built on the west side of town. Ownership was planning to reactivate the club for the start of the 1892 baseball season. The final Reds game played at East End Park was on August 13 against the Boston Reds. The game resulted in a 1-7 Cincinnati loss. The club's final game was on the road with an 8-0 loss to the St. Louis Browns on August 16, 1891, in St. Louis.

The Milwaukee Brewers of the Western League stepped in and finished out the Reds schedule. Several of Mike Kelly's Reds joined the Milwaukee club including business manager Frank Bancroft. The Brewers played their first game on the 18th, again in St. Louis. Kelly was not among the new club's members, as he returned to his familiar home in Boston to resume his career, playing with the AA's Boston Reds club and then finishing the season with the Boston Beaneaters of the NL.

Kelly's Beaneaters won the League pennant while the Boston Reds would go on to win the Association pennant. This proved to be the last hurrah for the Association, which merged with the National League during the off-season. With a Cincinnati team already in the National League, the Cincinnati Association franchise was done.

== Aftermath and legacy ==
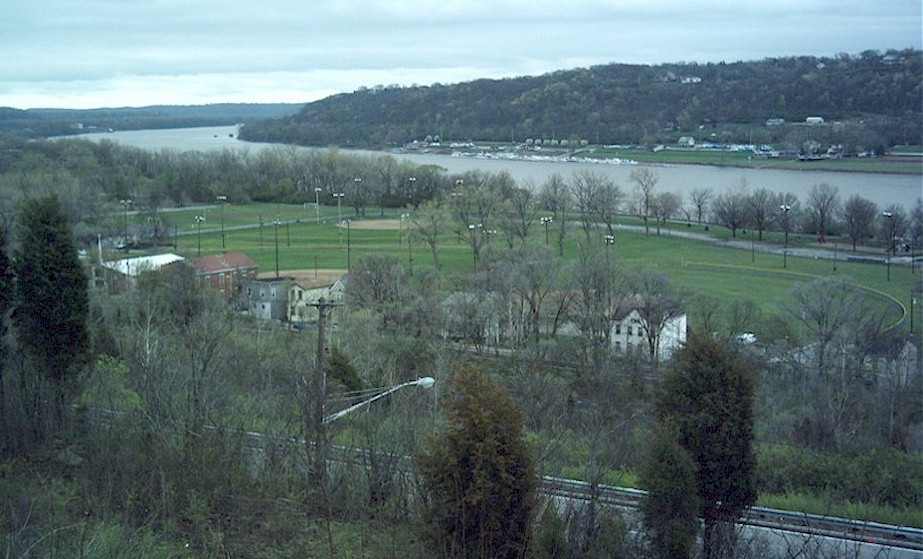
The site of East End Park in 2008

In 1896, a few years after the short-lived experiment with major league baseball on the east side of Cincinnati failed, the Pendleton grounds were acquired by the Cincinnati Gymnasium and Athletic Club, and became known as the Cincinnati Gym Grounds. The Athletic Club retained the ballfield and grandstand, and built a swimming pool in the center field area near the clubhouse building.

The East End ballpark suffered severe damage following flooding in the spring of 1897, situated as it was in the floodplain of the Ohio River. The outfield wall and bleachers were swept out into the Ohio River, leaving just the grandstand, pavilion and club house. All were restored during late spring of 1897 and were ready for use again.

The ballpark was considered for use as a temporary home for the National League Reds in 1900, after League Park was severely damaged by fire the night of May 27–28. The Reds instead chose to play their games on the road for the next month until their own park could be sufficiently restored.

Cincinnati's Board of Park Commissioners and Park Department proposed a concrete sidewalk to be created and that it extend the length of the park bordering with Eastern Avenue to provide a place for people to walk to and from work; however a 10-foot artificial stone sidewalk was established. Thoughts of improving the grounds were not welcomed as the annual flooding prevents permanent structures from being built. Benches that had been placed the year before were washed away by the recent floods.

The larger park area once known as Pendleton Park (which historians often present as the name for the ballpark itself) still exists and is currently known as Schmidt Recreation Complex or Schmidt Recreation Center, which has four softball diamonds, two of them overlapping the East End Park site, and two of them further west within the park.

The current softball field known as C.L. Harrison Field approximates the original orientation of the diamond, only somewhat farther to the north. The photographic evidence indicates that the original 1891 diamond was located in what would be the right field area of the Harrison field. In the opposite corner of the property, another softball field, the current Paul Kramer Field, occupies what was once the outfield area of East End Park.

The surroundings of the park are not significantly different from the 1890s. A number of the nearby houses still stand. Aerial views from Google maps indicate that water from the Ohio still wreaks occasional havoc with the ballfields there.

Only a small number of major league baseball fields from the 1890s survive as athletic fields (Cleveland's League Park, and St. Louis' Sportsman's Park, for example.). The two softball diamonds occupying East End Park's footprint allow the visitor a rare opportunity to imagine major league baseball being played there, over a century earlier.
