= Play Ball: Stories of the Ball Field =

1888 autobiographical collection by King Kelly

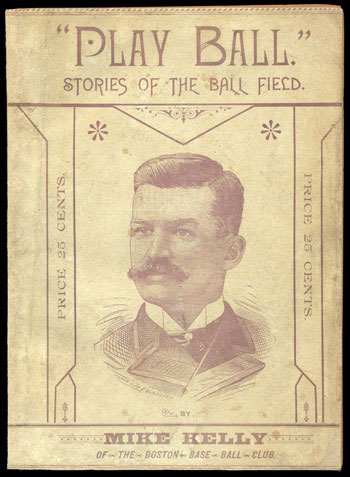
- Author: King Kelly
- Language: English
- Subject: King Kelly
- Genre: Autobiography, Sports book
- Publisher: Emery & Hughes
- Publication date: 1888
- Publication place: United States
- Media type: Paperback

Play Ball: Stories of the Ball Field is an 1888 autobiographical collection of baseball stories from Major League Baseball player King Kelly. Kelly had come to Boston one year earlier to play for the Boston Beaneaters. The book was organized and put together by Boston Globe journalist John J. "Jack" Drohan.

Howard W. Rosenberg's 2004 biography of Kelly dispelled any notion that Boston reporter Jake Morse had been the ghostwriter, by quoting Drohan's involvement with the book at length, including unearthing the following sentence about Drohan from the 1889 book "The Story of the Irish in Boston.": "His only literary work outside of his newspaper was the preparation of M. J. Kelly's book, 'Play Ball.'"

== History ==
King Kelly was a right fielder, catcher, and manager in various professional American baseball leagues from the late 1870s to the early 1890s. Kelly had played for the Chicago White Stockings for several seasons, but things grew more contentious as time passed there. Kelly drank heavily, occasionally requiring him to miss games or play drunk. In earlier seasons team owner Al Spalding had been willing to tolerate these events because of Kelly's skill and fan appeal. Spalding, following losses to the St. Louis Browns in 1885 and 1886 in matches of NL and AA pennant winners (a precursor to the World Series), gave in to complaints over Kelly's drinking (particularly by manager Cap Anson) and tried to control Kelly. Spalding and Anson tried to Kelly's drinking in various ways including withholding $250 of his $2000 salary in 1886, promising to return it if Kelly remained sober. These efforts failed, however, as Kelly continued to drink.

The reserve clause was a common tool to control player contracts in this era of baseball before free agency. Without free agency, Kelly's only way to force a trade was to tell Spalding, "I will not play again in the Chicago club, under any circumstances, and don't you forget it." His time with Boston teams began with the Boston Beaneaters in 1887.
