= King Kelly =

American baseball player and manager (1857–1894)

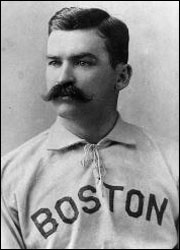
- Outfielder / Catcher / Manager
- Born: December 31, 1857; Troy, New York, U.S.
- Died: November 8, 1894 (aged 36); Boston, Massachusetts, U.S.
- Batted: Right Threw: Right

MLB debut
- May 1, 1878, for the Cincinnati Reds

Last MLB appearance
- September 2, 1893, for the New York Giants

MLB statistics
- Batting average: .308
- Home runs: 69
- Runs batted in: 950
- Stolen bases: 368
- Stats at Baseball Reference

Teams
- As player: Cincinnati Reds (1878–1879); Chicago White Stockings (1880–1886); Boston Beaneaters (1887–1889); Boston Reds (1890); Cincinnati Kelly's Killers (1891); Boston Reds (1891); Boston Beaneaters (1891–1892); New York Giants (1893); As manager: Boston Beaneaters (1887); Boston Reds (1890); Cincinnati Kelly's Killers (1891)

Career highlights and awards
- 2× NL batting champion (1884, 1886); 3× NL runs scored leader (1884–1886); 6× NL Champion (1880, 1881, 1882, 1885, 1886, 1892); Players' League Champion (1890); Chicago Cubs Hall of Fame

Member of the National

Baseball Hall of Fame
- Induction: 1945
- Election method: Old-Timers Committee

Michael Joseph "King" Kelly (December 31, 1857 – November 8, 1894), also commonly known as "$10,000 Kelly", was an American baseball outfielder, catcher, and player-manager in various professional American baseball leagues including the National League, International Association, Players' League, and the American Association. He spent the majority of his 16-season playing career with the Chicago White Stockings and the Boston Beaneaters. Kelly was a player-manager three times in his career – in 1887 for the Beaneaters, in 1890 leading the Boston Reds to the pennant in the only season of the Players' League's existence, and in 1891 for the Cincinnati Kelly's Killers – before his retirement in 1893. He is also often credited with helping to popularize various strategies as a player such as the hit and run, the hook slide, and the catcher's practice of backing up first base. In 1945, Kelly was elected to the Baseball Hall of Fame.

In concluding where to truly give Kelly credit as an innovator, a 2004 book devoted to 19th-century rule bending in baseball—and which came close to exhaustively accounting for all contemporary reporting on various subjects—placed stress on the following: "Kelly's hook slide does sound special, and players probably tried to copy it. Also, he seems to have been the first big leaguer to successfully cut a base (when the usually lone umpire wasn't looking), at least according to the newspaper record." And, "Kelly could have been the first to foul off lots of pitches on purpose. Doing so was a top trick of some Baltimore players of the 1890s. At the turn of the century, that trick was defused when all foul balls began counting as strikes." Kelly holds the record for stolen bases in a season by a primary catcher, with 56 in 1888. (Note: A primary catcher is defined as a player who played at least 50% of their team's games in a given season at catcher.) (Note: Stolen bases were counted differently in professional baseball before the statistic was strictly defined in 1898.)

Kelly's autobiography Play Ball: Stories of the Ball Field was published while he was with the Beaneaters in 1888, the first autobiography by a baseball player; it was ghostwritten by Boston baseball writer John J. "Jack" Drohan. Kelly also became a vaudeville performer during his playing career, first performing in Boston where he would recite the now-famous baseball poem "Casey at the Bat", sometimes butchering it. Kelly's baserunning innovations are also the subject of the hit 1889 song entitled "Slide, Kelly, Slide" and a 1927 comedy film of the same name.

== Early life ==
Kelly was born in Troy, New York, to Michael Kelly Sr. and his wife Catharine, both Irish immigrants. Upon the outbreak of the American Civil War, his father joined the Union Army, and Mike likely learned to play baseball while living with his mother and younger brother James in Washington, D.C. After the war, his ill father moved the family to Paterson, New Jersey. Kelly's parents apparently died within about five years of each other and he was orphaned by age 18. A best guess, based on tracking Paterson city directories, is that his father died around 1871, and his mother around 1876, when Michael was 18. According to the 1870 census, a Michael Kelly of his age was working in a silk mill in Paterson as of that year.

== Early career ==
By 1873, the fifteen-year-old Kelly was good enough to be invited to play baseball on Blondie Purcell's amateur team in Paterson, which played teams throughout the New York metro area, including the Brooklyn Atlantics from the National Association. From 1875 to 1877, he played three seasons as a semi-pro: in Paterson and then other cities.

In 1877, he was with the Paterson Olympics until around June 10, when he joined the Delawares of Port Jervis, New York. In mid-July, a Paterson paper said he had signed with a Springfield, Ohio, team after rejecting a Port Jervis offer of $70 a month (equivalent to $2,116 in 2025). A few weeks later, Port Jervis had not played again when he signed "with the celebrated Buckeye club of Columbus, Ohio."

He made his big league debut in 1878 with Cincinnati. In 1877, Kelly's friend Jim McCormick was signed to play for the Columbus Buckeyes of the International Association, and he recommended that his friend Mike be signed to be his catcher. The year after that, Kelly signed to play for the Cincinnati Reds, then known as the Red Stockings. Although the concept would come later, Mike Kelly was now a major leaguer.

== Career in Chicago ==
After playing in Cincinnati for two years as an outfielder and backup catcher, Cincinnati and Chicago White Stockings players went on a tour of California. While there, Chicago secured him for 1880, then-Chicago Secretary Albert Spalding doing the signing. Later from San Francisco, Kelly wrote Spalding, who was back in Chicago, "Cincinnati Club has gone back on us. Please send expenses. Am broke." Cincinnati had fallen on hard times by 1879 and released all their players at the end of that season to save having to pay them a last paycheck.

As of 1879, Chicago was the most important city financially in the National League, as it drew the best attendance for teams taking long train rides from the East Coast.

Kelly was now a young and wealthy man. Rather than buying a house, Kelly immediately moved into the Palmer House.

As a member of the White Stockings, he was annually among the league leaders in most offensive categories, including leading the league in runs from 1884 through 1886 (120, 124 and 155 respectively), and batting in 1884 and 1886 (.354 and .388). One of the best defensive catchers in baseball, he was also one of the first to use a glove and wear a chest protector. Chicago won five pennants while Kelly played for the White Stockings.

== Career in Boston ==
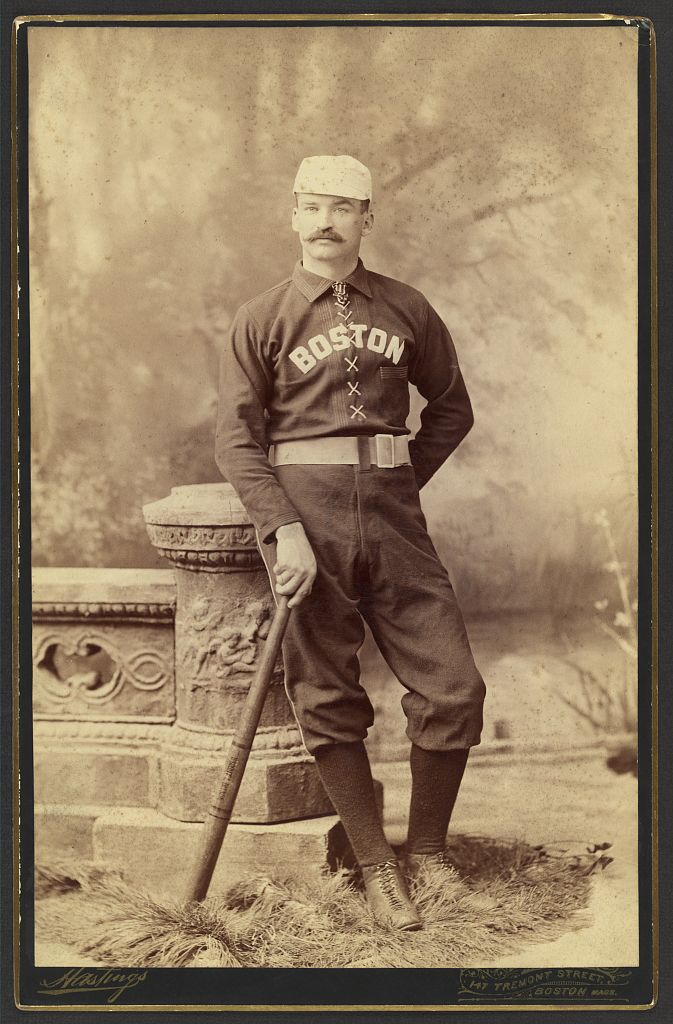
Kelly c. 1887

After the 1886 season Spalding sold Kelly to the Boston Beaneaters for a then-record $10,000 (equivalent to $358,333 in 2025), after Kelly balked at returning to the club. Right before the sale, Chicago writer Happy Palmer quoted Spalding about his plans to manage Kelly: "Oh, tie him up, I guess, if he really is averse to playing here. He may have his ugly up, and I guess from the way he is holding out in his refusal to sign that that is the case. All right, though. I am willing, and if he keeps on in that spirit I'll make him eat hay with his horses before he is much older. He has been mad long enough now, and it is pretty near time somebody was getting mad at this end of the line. One thing I can certainly predict and that is that if Mr. Mike Kelly does not sign a contract with Chicago pretty d--d quick, he will have cause to regret it. That is all."

As a result of the sale, he became known as the "$10,000 Beauty." In 1881, actress Louise Montague had been so dubbed after winning a $10,000 contest for handsomest woman in the world.

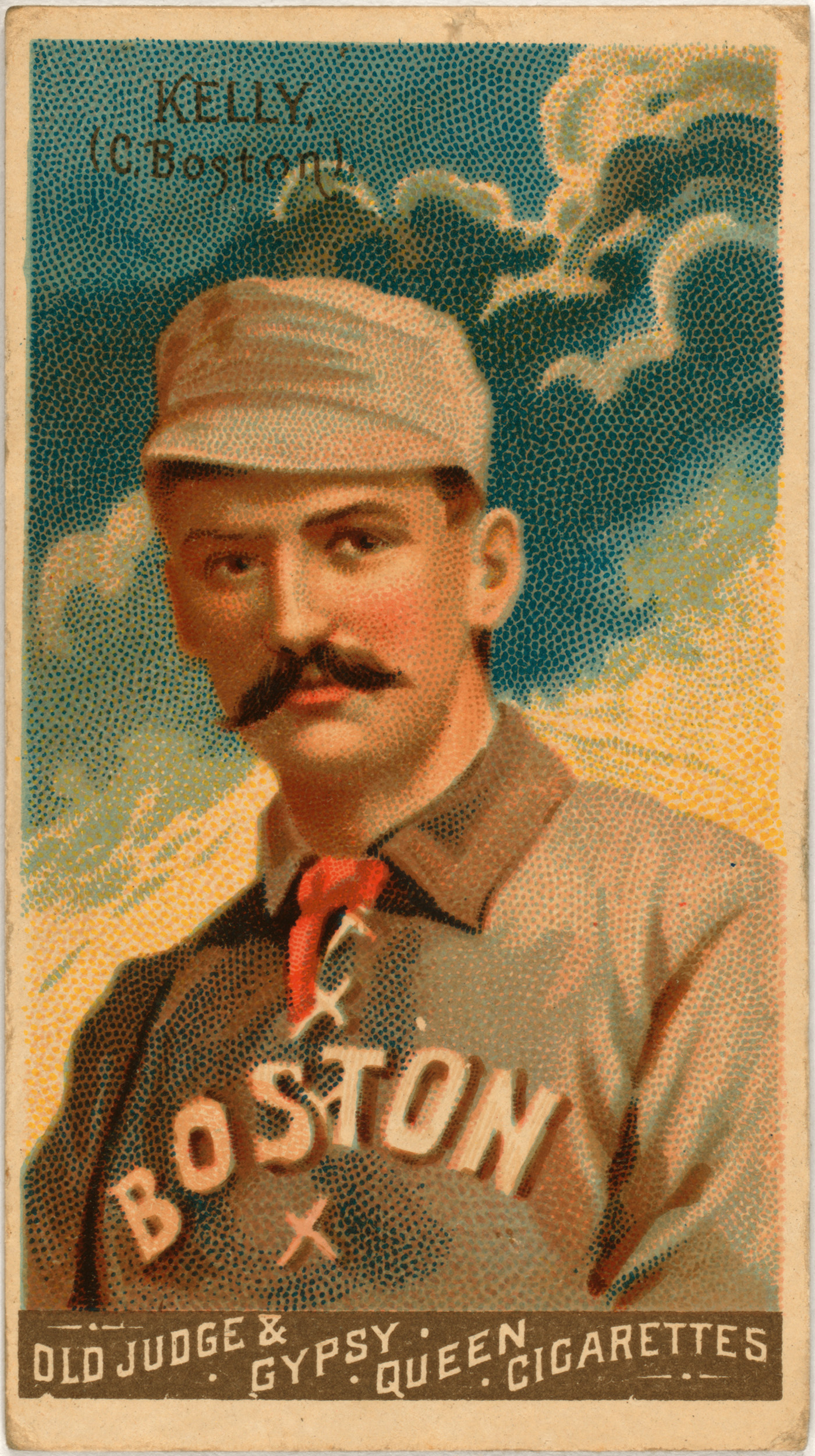
King Kelly cigarette card (Goodwin & Company, 1888)

It was in Boston that Mike became "King" Kelly, although he was still overwhelmingly referred to as "Mike" or "The Only" in contemporaneous reporting. As a member of the Beaneaters, he continued to be a key run-producer, scoring 120 runs in 1887 and 1889. He continued to play well and was a great box office draw, but Boston didn't win any pennants. Freed from the watchful eye of Spalding and Anson, Kelly became less self-disciplined. One day in 1888, Boston player-manager John Morrill fined him $100 for not reporting to the grounds. After dinner the night before, Kelly had told Morrill he was ill, and Morrill said he should still report. The Boston Herald said, "Every man on the team thinks [the $100 fine] was deserved." The Herald also said of Kelly, "At times he goes in and plays with his whole spirit, and he puts life into the team. A sample of that was seen in yesterday's game, a game that he won for the Bostons. At other times he plays carelessly and indifferently, puts on a spirit of independence, disobeys Morrill on instructions at will, and does as he pleases."

Kelly managed and played for the Boston Reds in the year-lived Players' League in 1890, and the Reds won the only Players' League title.

During the 1890 season, friends bought him a $10,000 house at South Hingham, Massachusetts, about 15 miles southeast of Boston. Contributors included former umpire John Kelly, the owner of their New York bar; Boston fans Arthur "Hi! Hi!" Dixwell and Frank Norton, and Boston Players' League President Charles A. Prince and Secretary Julian B. Hart. They contributed $300 each (equivalent to $10,750 in 2025). Others who gave included John Graham, Jim McCormick, and captains Buck Ewing of New York and John Montgomery Ward of Brooklyn. The house, worth $10,000, could not be mortgaged based on the $1,100 in donations, $400 of which went for a horse and carriage, so in the winter of 1890-91, father-in-law John Headifen "came to the rescue of his (Kelly's) [sic] friends and subscribed $1800", the Boston Record said. The Old Colony Savings Bank in Plymouth then gave a matching $2,500 loan, and with that a mortgage was obtained. When he signed with Boston in August 1891, the club's directors gave him a check for $4,300 for "lifting the mortgage on his 'popular subscription' home."

The house, stable and land would be put up for sale in the spring of 1893 for unpaid taxes of $123 (equivalent to $4,407 in 2025). It also had a $2,000 mortgage left at five percent interest. In October 1893, the house would be sold.

In 1898, Boston National League Director William H. Conant would recall having paid, around the time of the 1891 payment, a $200 bar bill for Kelly and friends and being forwarded, on a visit to the bar later that night, another Kelly tab for $140.

== Later career ==
In 1891, Kelly returned to Cincinnati as the captain of a newly established American Association club there. The team was generally known as the Reds, but were also often called "Kelly's Killers" in the media due to Kelly's strong presence. The team was in seventh place when it folded in mid-August, and Kelly signed with the Boston Reds, who had moved to the Association after the Players' League folded. He spent just four games with the Reds before jumping back across town to the Beaneaters to finish out the season.

After spending the 1892 season with the Beaneaters, batting a career-worst .189, his contract was assigned to the New York Giants for 1893. He played just 20 games for the Giants, batting .269 and driving in 15 runs.

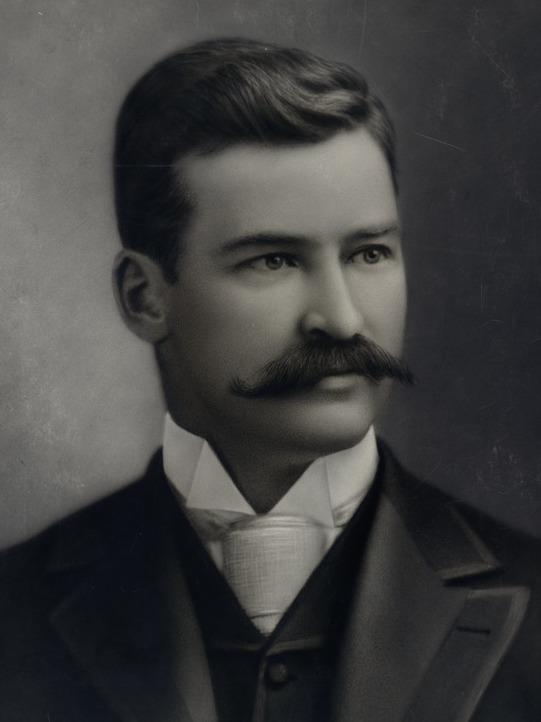
1887 portrait of Michael "King" Kelly

Kelly's big league career ended after the 1893 season, having compiled 1357 runs, 69 home runs, 950 RBI, and a .308 batting average. Unreliable record-keeping practices of the era prevent an accurate estimate of how many stolen bases Kelly compiled over his career, but statistics kept during his later years indicate he regularly stole 50 or more bases in a season, including a high of 84 in 1887. He also managed to steal six bases in one game.

In 1894, Kelly signed with Albert L. Johnson, the main benefactor of the 1890 Players' League, to play for his new minor league club in Allentown, Pa. Days before signing him, Johnson had assumed control of the Allentown & Lehigh Valley Traction Company, a trolley line.

In one of the last significant comments about Kelly's baseball career, financially, while he was still alive, George W. Floyd said the following to the Chicago Herald in March 1894:

"Kelly got the worst of it in every deal he made. When he went from the Boston players' team [in 1890] to the local [association] club [in 1891] he helped that team to make over $100,000 [about $2 million today]. The club at that time was no better than fifth [not sure if that detail is relevant] and his desertion more than anything else gave the finishing blow to the brotherhood [Players' League]. Mike was popular wherever he played. The trouble with him was that he had no brain as he himself was concerned. He knew enough to make money for others, but never could make anything for himself. I don't think that his playing days are over yet, but every club in the league seems inclined to turn him down. Mike has a great many friends in every town where baseball is played and it will be bad policy on the magnates' [owners'] part to retire him from the game which he has adorned so long."

In mid-August 1894, Allentown left the Pennsylvania State League for the Eastern League and moved to Yonkers, N.Y., where Johnson also had a streetcar line. "The parting may be cruel and mercenary--but regrets--well, hardly any. So au revoir, Mike", the Allentown City Item said. Before disbanding, Kelly failed to heed Johnson's instructions to release the players. By not releasing them, his old league was able to file a complaint with baseball's Board of Control challenging the maneuver. At a meeting in New York, the board ruled that for the next ten days, the Pennsylvania State League could claim Allentown's players. Eastern League President Pat Powers said Kelly was to blame "and President A. L. Johnson of the latter club [Allentown], who was also present, voiced the same sentiments", the New York Sun said.

== Slide, Kelly, Slide! ==
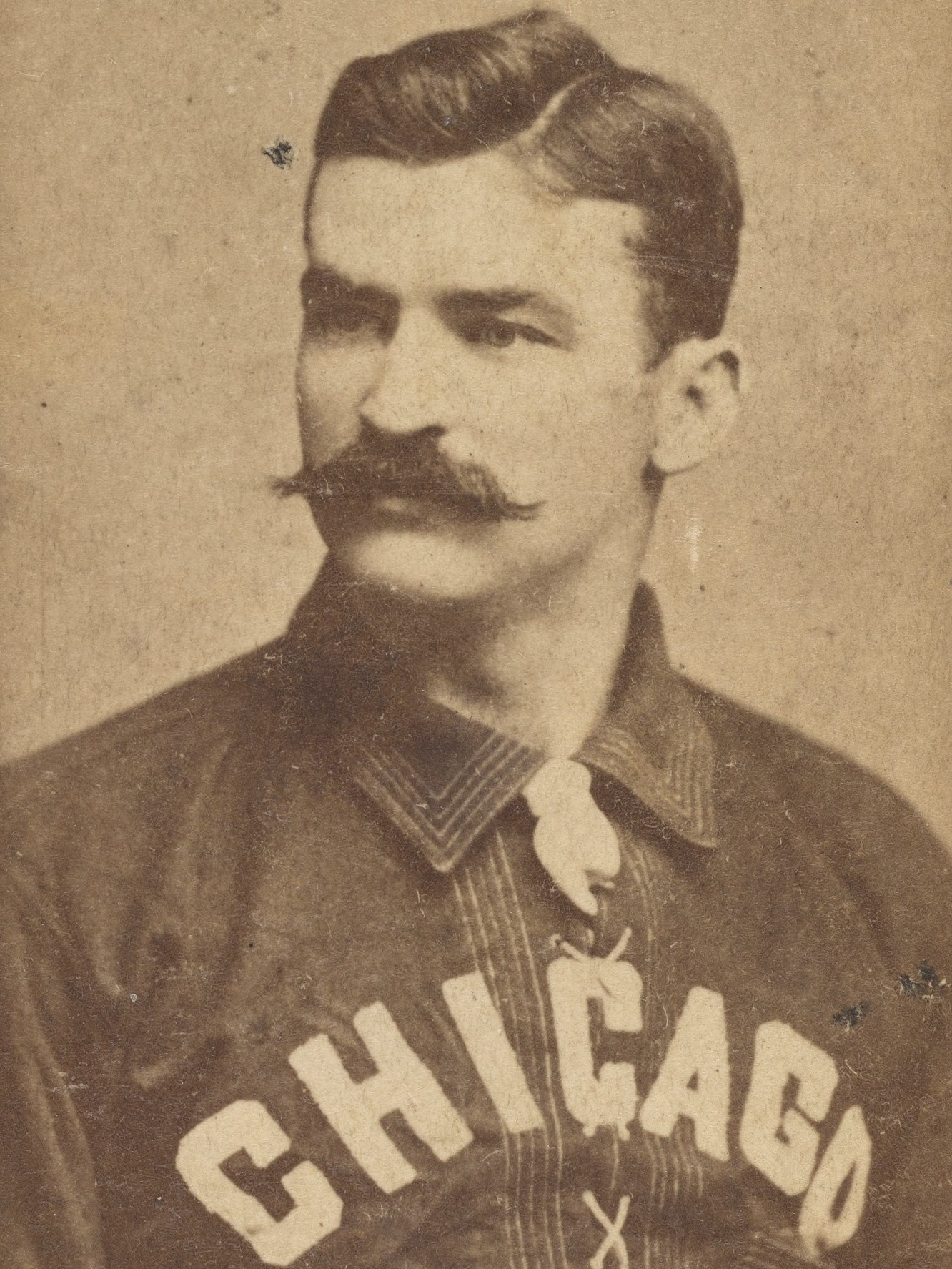
"$10,000 Kelly" card photo, late 1880s

The song, "Slide, Kelly, Slide" was America's first "pop hit" record, after its release by Edison Studios, and in 1927 inspired a film version of Slide, Kelly, Slide. Prior to that song, most recordings (cylinders), were opera, religious or patriotic in nature. Kelly is also considered to have been the first man to popularize autographing, as fans pursued him on his way to the ballpark for his signature in the 1890s. Prints of a painting of him sliding into second hung in most Irish saloons in Boston, and he was among the first athletes to perform on the vaudeville stage. His own autobiography, Play Ball, was the first written by a baseball player. The book was put together by Boston Globe reporter John Drohan.

Howard W. Rosenberg's 2004 biography of Kelly dispelled any notion that Boston reporter Jake Morse had been the ghostwriter, by quoting Drohan's involvement with the book at length, including unearthing the following sentence from a biography of Drohan in an 1889 book about the Irish in Boston: "His only literary work outside of his newspaper was the preparation of M. J. Kelly's book, 'Play Ball.'"

== Vaudeville career ==
Kelly took up acting soon after his arrival in Boston. Fellow Boston Elk lodge member and actor Nat Goodwin, a writer said around that time, "repeatedly urged Kelly to abandon his diamond affiliations and embrace the fascinations of stage life, Goodwin claiming that Kelly is a natural born comedian." Goodwin, a native of Boston, had been a founder of its Elks lodge in 1878. George W. Floyd, Goodwin's manager and a native of nearby Quincy, was also a charter member of the lodge and one of its early directors. Floyd was arguably the first player agent in baseball history. For example, in 1892, Floyd told the Chicago Herald that he had secured Kelly's new contract with Boston. It included a percentage of the club's earnings above $10,000. Floyd also said, "Kelly is taking the best care of himself and is well fixed. The boodle [his money] is in the shape of gilt-edged securities and 'mammy,' as Kel affectionately terms his wife, has charge of it."

In March 1888, Kelly made his regular play debut, as Dusty Bob in Charles H. "Charley" Hoyt's "A Rag Baby." Hoyt had been a Boston baseball writer and was a Boston Elk. A national fraternal group, the Elks were founded in the 1860s and into the mid-twentieth century had close ties to the theatrical profession.

As an example of his later vaudeville career, during the off-seasons of 1892-93, which extended into the 1893 season, he appeared in January 1893 in New York at the Imperial Music Hall on West 29th Street. He was billed as "King Kelly, the Monarch of the Baseball Field." His trousers and shirt collar were too big and he buttoned his jacket wrong. Also, his straw hat was a size too small. "It was impossible to look at this vaudeville make-up and not laugh", the New York Sun said. "Kelly laughed, too, and shook a roll of music at a lot of friends up in the private boxes." Kelly came on after two French singers of opera. Stage partner William "Billy" Jerome "took off his hat to him, and introduced him as 'Mr. Kelly, the famous $10,000 peach.'" They sang a parody. Later, after reciting "Casey at the Bat", he said, according to the Sun, "I'm right at home with Casey." Also, "It's the first time I've been in these clothes, and I don't quite understand them. Besides I've been over to Guttenberg [a track in New Jersey] to-day, and that is an excuse for anything that a man may do. Come and see me again. I'm obliged for your welcome."

In the off-season of 1893-94, Kelly performed with Mark Murphy in "O'Dowd's Neighbors." Of the first city on the tour, Dover, N.J., Murphy said Kelly called it "the very first town I ever played a game of ball in out [sic] of Patsy!" Patsy, Murphy explained, "is Kellyesque for Paterson."

== Casey at the Bat ==
There is an unsettled debate about whether Kelly was the model for the title character in Ernest Lawrence Thayer's 1888 poem "Casey at the Bat." Thayer, as a baseball reporter for the San Francisco Examiner, had seen Kelly play after the 1887 season, when he was on a playing tour to San Francisco. A "best guess" is to take Thayer at his word that he chose the name "Casey" after a non-player of Irish ancestry he once knew. However, open to debate is who, if anyone, he modeled Casey's baseball situations after. Arguably the best big league candidate is Kelly, the most colorful, top player of the day of Irish ancestry. Thayer, in a 1905 letter, singles out Kelly as showing "impudence" in claiming to have written the poem. If he still felt offended, Thayer may have steered later comments away from connecting Kelly to it. Cap Anson 2, the definitive biography of Kelly, states that it did not find Kelly claiming to have been the poem's author.

== Controversy and cheating ==
Kelly was an adept baserunner, leading the National League in runs scored three times and ranking among the league leaders in stolen bases.

His baserunning was legendary in other ways as well. His arguably most frequent brilliant play was always legitimate—a feetfirst hook slide to avoid being tagged. In 1889, Tim Murnane of the Boston Globe said that nine times out of ten, Kelly would "throw himself out of the reach of the baseman, and catch the bag from the outside." Also, "Kelly is not a sprinter, but can get a great start, and this counts more than a fine slide, as a catcher is likely to be hurried when he sees the runner well on his way to a base."

Upon Kelly's death, former teammate Tom Brown said, "He originated the slide which I do now in base running, and which is very generally copied by many ball players. The scheme is to slide to the side and get out of the way of the baseman, and not dash into him in the old way. Owing to the success of Kelly's sliding the topical song [`Slide, Kelly, Slide!' by J. W. Kelly, of no relation] was written."

Kelly also became famous for making unusual plays. He seems to have performed most just a few times and probably made a bigger mark with verbal trickery, while catcher or coacher at first or third base. Right after his death, his longtime captain-manager in Chicago, Cap Anson, said he was a "genius" as a coacher. Apparently referring to Kelly's ability to distract opposing fielders, Anson said, "Many a run has been scored through Kelly's trickiness. He was a rattling all-around man, but his cleverest work was done behind the plate [while catching]. He was full of tricks and was never so happy as when playing a practical joke." A year later, Anson said, "Mike Kelly was the prince of base runners. I've never seen a man equal to him in that line, and he could get away with more sharp tricks than any man who ever wore a baseball uniform."

Kelly's uniqueness was in making four attempts to cut bases, while the then-lone umpire wasn't looking, in the apparent first prevalent year of the trick: 1881. A methodical study of trickery in early baseball found Kelly cutting bases just a few more times over the rest of his career, and none at other times through 1886, his last year with Chicago. From 1887 to 1893, four seems to be his number of cuts. One was a success. Twice he was called out. Once he went back after being spotted. From 1881 to 1893, the relevant years to compare, dozens of players cut bases.

In his day, a much more common tricky play was fouling off pitches to draw a walk. Until the first years of the twentieth century, batters were generally not charged with a strike for fouling off a pitch. Fouled-off bunts started counting as strikes in 1894, when Kelly's big league career was over.

Some of the wildest stories of his trickery were not reported contemporaneously by reporters. Perhaps the most famous play that has been wrongly credited to Kelly—at least as taking place during a game that mattered—is from around 1890. In his 1994 The Rules of Baseball, David Nemec relates the following "often-told Kelly tale" and is the rare writer to say it is either false or embellished. As cited in Rosenberg's definitive biography of Kelly, Cap Anson 2 (2004), a former teammate of Kelly, Charlie Bennett, said the following after Kelly's death in 1894:

Supposedly, Kelly was not in the game when an opposing batter hit a foul fly. Seeing that catcher Charlie Ganzel could not catch the ball, Kelly announced himself in and made the play. The story would have most likely been from 1889, 1891 or 1892, when Ganzel and Kelly were teammates. Bennett said, "During a game one day, [Kelly] sat on the bench and Ganzel was behind the bat [catching]. A foul fly was popped up, out of Ganzel's reach, when quick as a flash 'Kel' ran forward, ordered Ganzel out of the game, caught the ball, and then ordered the umpire to declare the batter out. [Kelly] maintained with a great deal of force, that he had as much right to order Ganzel out of the game, while a ball was in the air, as at any other time during the progress of the game. However, the decision went against him.

Rosenberg could not find a contemporaneous account of Kelly having done that, and it is possible he did so in an exhibition game. The closest sounding story to the above appeared right after Kelly's death, when John D. "Johnny" Foster of the Cleveland Leader wrote, "The nearest that he ever approached to downright malice in playing in Cleveland was during a game between Cleveland and Boston for the national championship when he called a Cleveland player's name as two men were running for a foul fly."

== Death ==
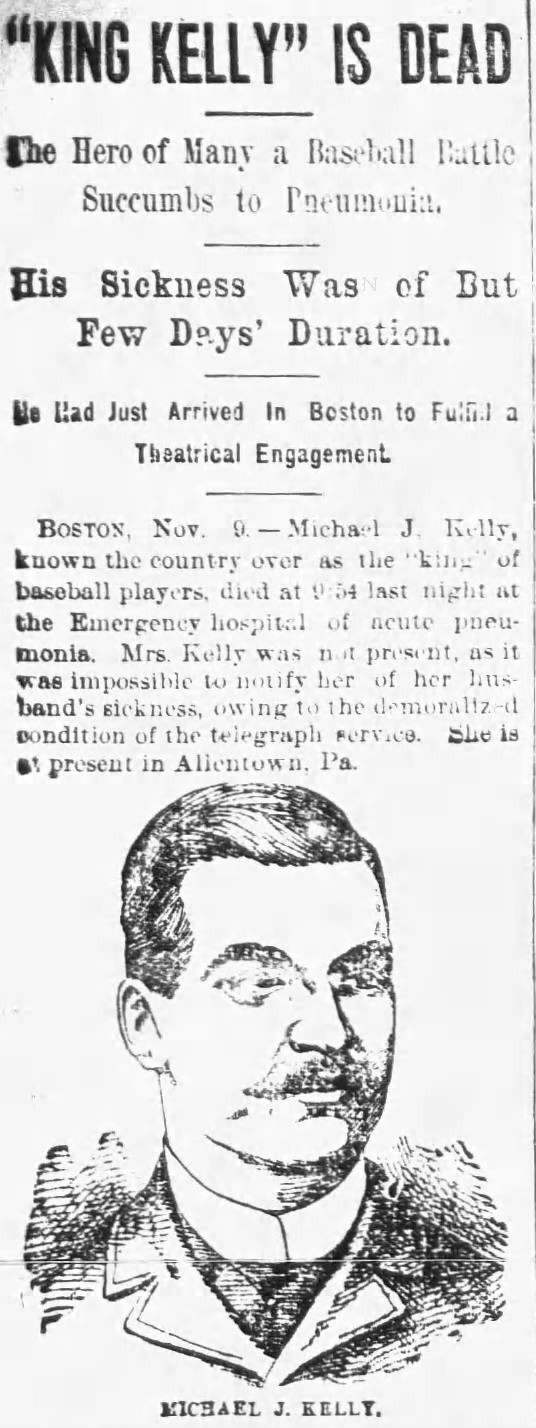
Headline in the Fall River Evening News announcing Kelly's death

In November 1894, Kelly died of pneumonia in Boston. He had taken a boat there from New York to appear at the Palace Theatre with the London Gaiety Girls. At the start of the final week of his life, an advertisement in Boston read: "Slide, Kelly, Slide. Palace Theatre. The London Gaiety Girls, Chaperoned by King Kelly, the Famous $10,000 Base Ballist." During the week, his name was deleted when he was too ill to appear. "He caught a slight cold on the boat from New York, but thought little of it", a writer said upon his death.

During that week in Boston he stayed in the Plymouth House, owned by Bill Anderson, a fellow Elk. Noticing how ill Kelly seemed, Anderson had him rest and called for a doctor. The doctor had him taken to his private room in the hospital. Kelly's wife and brother were notified but did not arrive in time to see him alive. Anderson, fellow Elk John Graham and the former secretary of Boston of the Players' League and the American Association, Julian B. Hart, were with him at the end.

About 7,000 people passed by the open casket. At a benefit for widow Agnes "Aggie" [nee Headifen] a week later, some of the songs performed were "The Irish Queen", "Nothing is Too Good for the Irish" and "Poor Mick."

George W. Floyd, a main organizer of the benefit, wired Aggie with news about the proceeds. Days later, he presented a letter to National League owners meeting in New York. Aggie needed money, he said. Right after adjourning a meeting, the owners pledged $1,400 to her (equivalent to $52,096 in 2025).

Aggie, who never remarried, died in 1937 in New Brunswick, New Jersey. After Mike's death, she made her living by sewing, stopping when her eyesight failed. Seventeen months before her death, and her health declining, she was interviewed by the New Brunswick Sunday Times. She said Mike to her was "just an overgrown kid" and, in a reporter's paraphrase, "always eager to help a young fellow on the field [presumably a teammate], never pugnacious despite his marvelous build of 190 pounds and six feet in height [really 5'10"], and charitable to the extreme."

When Kelly was inducted into the National Baseball Hall of Fame and Museum in 1945, there were no immediate family members to mark the occasion, as his apparently lone child had died in 1894 – after living only an hour.

== See also ==
- List of Major League Baseball batting champions
- List of Major League Baseball annual runs scored leaders
- List of Major League Baseball annual doubles leaders
- List of Major League Baseball career triples leaders
- List of Major League Baseball career runs scored leaders
- List of Major League Baseball career stolen bases leaders
- List of Major League Baseball player-managers
- List of Major League Baseball single-game hits leaders
