= Cincinnati Kelly's Killers =

Baseball team based in Ohio, U.S.

Information
- Location: Based in Cincinnati, Ohio
- Founded: 1891
- Folded: 1891
- Former league: American Association
- Former ballpark: East End Park (1891)
- Colors: Red, dark blue, white
- Ownership: Chris Von der Ahe
- Manager: King Kelly (1891)

Kelly's Killers were a Major League baseball team that played in Cincinnati, Ohio, during the 1891 baseball season. The team played in the American Association, which was a major league from 1882 to 1891.

== The team nickname ==
By contemporary newspaper accounts, the club was mainly referred to as the Cincinnati Reds, the same name as their cross-town rivals in the National League. This in addition to variants on the informal name "Kelly's Killers". It is the latter name, however, by which they are more broadly known today.

== A tale of three leagues ==
The Cincinnati Kelly's Killers were a response by the American Association to fill the void that the Cincinnati Reds had left when the club vacated the league after the 1889 season and again before the 1891 season. The Reds played in the National League for the 1890 season but were losing money and facing bankruptcy. Reds' ownership sold the club to Players' League investor Albert Johnson. Johnson then withdrew his newly acquired Reds club from the NL, intending to move it to the Players' League for the 1891 season. When the Players' League collapsed before that season could be played, Johnson committed the Reds to the American Association.

Meanwhile, the National League placed a new franchise in Cincinnati which was owned by John T. Brush. However, for reasons that are still unknown, Johnson decided to sell his Reds club back to the National League before the start of the season. The National League simply let Brush take control over the Reds as if they never left the league in the first place.

== Kelly's "Killers" ==
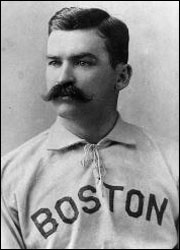
Mike "King" Kelly

The Association was crushed when the Reds left the league for a second time. The league placed a new franchise in the Queen City to fill the void left by the Reds' departure. The new Association club was owned by Chris von der Ahe, who also owned the St. Louis Browns. His new Cincinnati club would be captained by Mike "King" Kelly, whose major league career began in Cincinnati with the original National League Reds club of the 1870s.

== The Ballyard ==
The new Association club was in need of a ballpark. Vacant lots within the city were few and far between so ownership decided to build a ballpark in a picturesque location along the Ohio River that was known as Pendleton Park, or Pendleton Grounds. The club secured a lease and built a small ballpark within Pendleton Park, which was dubbed East End Park by the media. The location of the park was off Eastern Avenue (now called Riverside Drive), where the Schmidt Recreation Complex is currently located. Many fans reached games by steamboat, coming either from the city or from Coney Island. East End Park was one of only a handful of major league parks to have access by way of a river.

== The Season ==
The club got off to a terrible start and many of Mike Kelly's Killers were taken with the flu. Delays in the construction of the ballpark also left the club on the road for most of April. By the time Cincinnati played their first home game (April 25), Mike Kelly's men were 5-9.

As the season progressed, Mike Kelly and his killers found themselves in jail frequently as a result of attempting to play baseball on Sundays. At the time, the National League did not allow Sunday baseball games to be played. As a result, the rival Association capitalized on this by having their teams play Sunday games. The problem for Cincinnati was that the city had the blue law in place which also disallowed Sunday games. Owners of the club made repeated attempts at playing games on Sundays. Sometimes the Mayor of Cincinnati, Mayor John B. Mosby, would enforce the law and other times he would not. When the Mayor did enforce the law, the Killers and the players from the opposing team found themselves in jail.

As the season wore on the club lagged in the standings and were never true contenders. By August the club was 21 games out of first place and losing money.

== The demise ==
The inconvenient location of the club's ballpark, poor play on the field and the fact that they were competing for spectators with the Reds hurt the Kelly's Killers' attendance. By mid-August, it was decided by league leaders and club ownership to suspend the franchise for the remainder of the 1891 season and reactivate the club for the 1892 season in a brand new ballpark on the west side of town. With 34 games remaining on their schedule, the Milwaukee Brewers, of the Western League, stepped in and played out the Kel's remaining games. According to the Chicago Tribune, it was feared that the September meeting at the Latonia racetrack would hurt attendance. Frank Dwyer, Willie Mains, Farmer Vaughn and Jim Canavan all signed on to play for the Milwaukee club. Kelly returned to play for the Boston Reds for four games before jumping back to the National League's Boston Beaneaters.

Unfortunately the 1891 season would be the Association's final year. The circuit merged with the National League, transferring St. Louis, Louisville, Washington and Baltimore to the senior circuit while paying the other teams to disband.

== Year-by-year records ==
Season	Manager	Games	W	L	T	WP	PL	GB
1891	King Kelly	102	43	57	2	.430	7th	32.5

== Baseball Hall of Famers ==
- King Kelly

== See also ==
- 1891 Cincinnati Kelly's Killers season
- Cincinnati Kelly's Killers all-time roster
