= Sack (surname) =

Sack is a surname.

== People ==
Notable people with the surname include:

- August Friedrich Wilhelm Sack (1703–1786), German Reformed preacher and theologian
- Simon Heinrich Sack (1723–1791), German Privy Councillor to Frederick II of Prussia
- Friedrich Samuel Gottfried Sack (1738–1817), German Reformed theologian
- Karl Heinrich Sack (1789–1875), German Protestant theologian and university professor
- Karl Sack (1896–1946), German jurist and member of the anti-Nazi resistance movement in World War II
- Erna Sack (1898–1972), German opera singer (soprano)
- Jack Sack (1902–1980), American football player and coach
- John Sack (1930–2004), American journalist
- Jonathan Sacks (1948–2020), British Orthodox rabbi
- Sibylle Kemmler-Sack (1934–1999), German chemist
- Robert D. Sack (born 1939), American judge
- Robert L. Sack (born 1942), American physician
- Steve Sack (born 1953), American editorial cartoonist
- Brian Sack (born 1968), American actor and humorist
- Peter Sack (born 1979), German shot putter

== Fictional characters ==
- Johnny Sack, character in The Sopranos

== See also ==
- Sacks (surname)
