= 1792 =

1792 in various calendars
- Gregorian calendar: 1792; MDCCXCII
- French Republican calendar: 1 I
- Ab urbe condita: 2545
- Armenian calendar: 1241; ԹՎ ՌՄԽԱ
- Assyrian calendar: 6542
- Balinese saka calendar: 1713–1714
- Bengali calendar: 1198–1199
- Berber calendar: 2742
- British Regnal year: 32 Geo. 3 – 33 Geo. 3
- Buddhist calendar: 2336
- Burmese calendar: 1154
- Byzantine calendar: 7300–7301
- Chinese calendar: 辛亥年 (Metal Pig); 4489 or 4282 — to — 壬子年 (Water Rat); 4490 or 4283
- Coptic calendar: 1508–1509
- Discordian calendar: 2958
- Ethiopian calendar: 1784–1785
- Hebrew calendar: 5552–5553
- Hindu calendars
- Vikram Samvat: 1848–1849
- Shaka Samvat: 1713–1714
- Kali Yuga: 4892–4893
- Holocene calendar: 11792
- Igbo calendar: 792–793
- Iranian calendar: 1170–1171
- Islamic calendar: 1206–1207
- Japanese calendar: Kansei 4 (寛政４年)
- Javanese calendar: 1718–1719
- Julian calendar: Gregorian minus 11 days
- Korean calendar: 4125
- Minguo calendar: 120 before ROC 民前120年
- Nanakshahi calendar: 324
- Thai solar calendar: 2334–2335
- Tibetan calendar: ལྕགས་མོ་ཕག་ལོ་ (female Iron-Boar); 1918 or 1537 or 765 — to — ཆུ་ཕོ་བྱི་བ་ལོ་ (male Water-Rat); 1919 or 1538 or 766

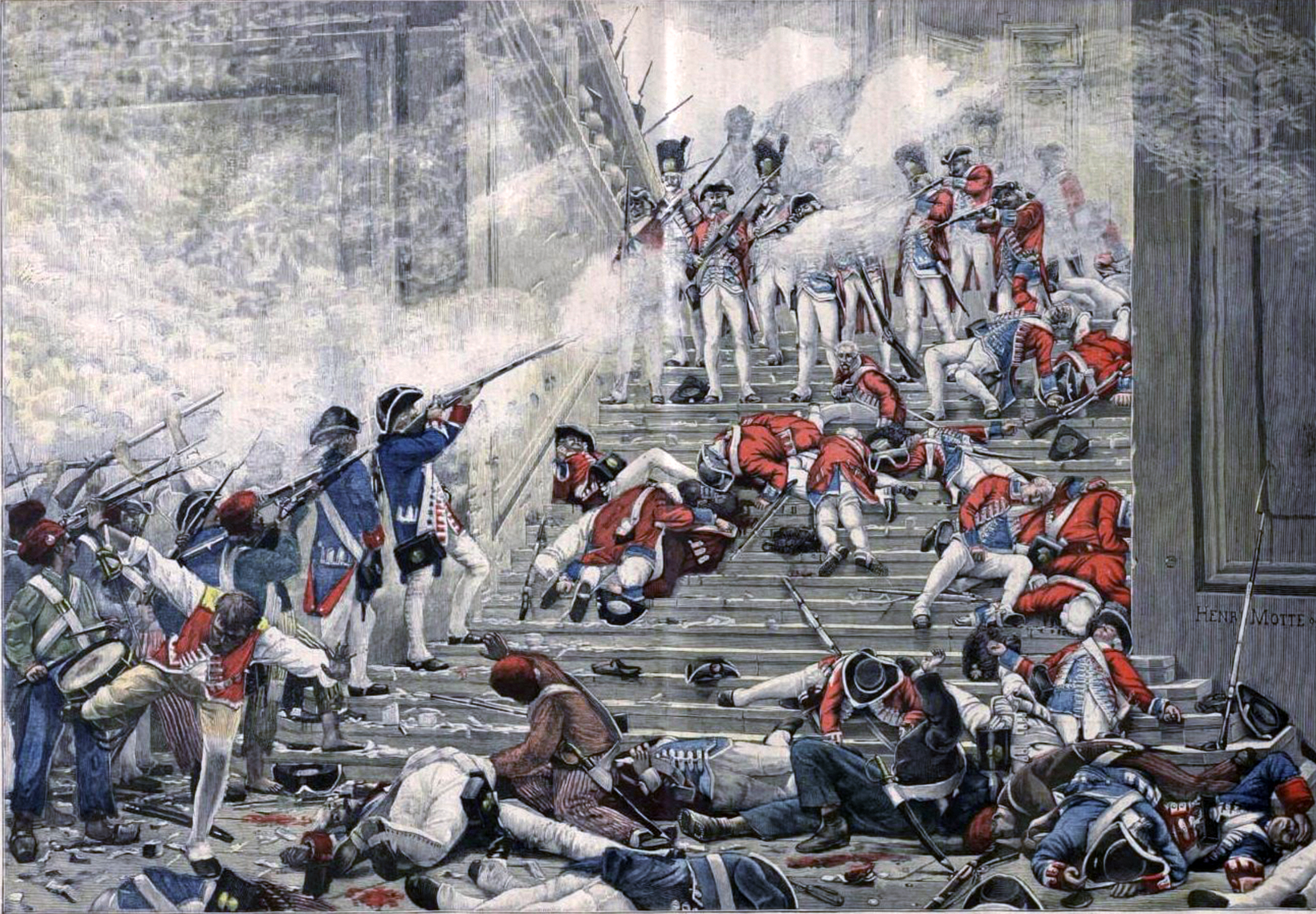
August 10: French Revolution leaders send troops to storm the Tuilleries Palace and capture King Louis XVI.

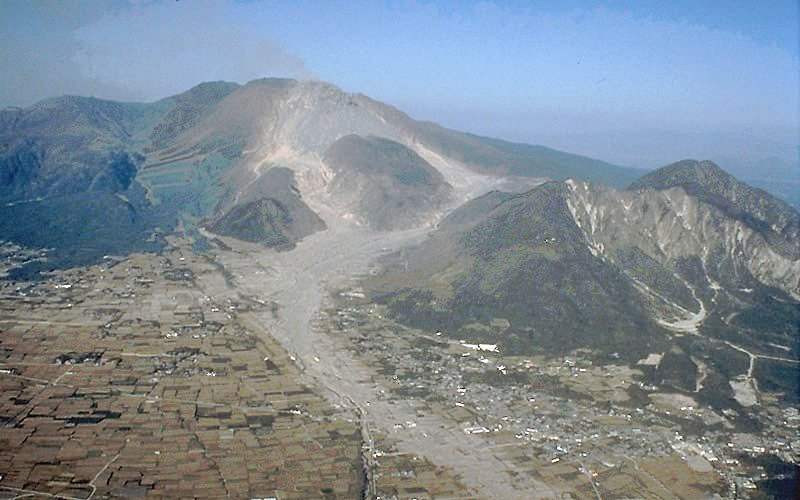
May 21: Mount Unzen erupts.

1792 (MDCCXCII) was a leap year starting on Sunday of the Gregorian calendar and a leap year starting on Thursday of the Julian calendar, the 1792nd year of the Common Era (CE) and Anno Domini (AD) designations, the 792nd year of the 2nd millennium, the 92nd year of the 18th century, and the 3rd year of the 1790s decade. As of the start of 1792, the Gregorian calendar was 11 days ahead of the Julian calendar, which remained in localized use until 1923.

== Events ==
=== January–March ===
- January 9 – The Treaty of Jassy ends the Russian Empire's war with the Ottoman Empire over Crimea.
- January 25 – The London Corresponding Society is founded.
- February 18 – Thomas Holcroft produces the comedy The Road to Ruin in London.
- February 20
  - The Postal Service Act, establishing the United States Post Office Department, is signed by President George Washington.
  - Parliament House, Dublin catches fire during a legislative session. "Although in imminent danger of the roof falling in," it is noted later, "the House did not adjourn until a proper motion had been put and carried in the affirmative."
- March 1 – Francis II, Holy Roman Emperor, the last emperor, takes office.
- March 7 – A settlement is formed in Sierra Leone in West Africa as a home for freed slaves.
- March 16 – Assassination of Gustav III: King Gustav III of Sweden is shot in the back by Jacob Johan Anckarström, at a midnight masquerade at the Royal Opera in Stockholm; he lives until March 29, and is then succeeded by his 14-year-old son, Gustav IV Adolf.
- March 20 – A new capital of North Carolina, and seat of the newly formed Wake County, is established after North Carolina State senator and surveyor William Christmas submits his design for the city. A few months later, the capital is officially named Raleigh, in honor of Sir Walter Raleigh.
- March 22 – Haitian Revolution: Battle of Croix-des-Bouquets – Black slave insurgents gain a victory in the first major battle of the revolution.
- March 25 – The National Legislative Assembly (France) agrees that the guillotine should be used for judicial executions.

=== April–June ===
- April 2 – The Coinage Act is passed, establishing the United States Mint.
- April 5 – United States President George Washington vetoes a bill designed to apportion representatives among U.S. states. This is the first time the presidential veto is used in the United States.
- April 20 – France declares war against Austria, beginning the French Revolutionary Wars and the War of the First Coalition.
- April 21 – Tiradentes, a leading figure in the Inconfidência Mineira conspiracy, is executed in Rio de Janeiro, Brazil.
- April 25
  - Highwayman Nicolas Pelletier becomes the first person executed by guillotine in France.
  - La Marseillaise, the French national anthem, is composed by Claude Joseph Rouget de Lisle.
- May 11 – Robert Gray's Columbia River expedition: Captain Robert Gray, on the Columbia Rediviva, becomes the first white man to discover the mouth of the Columbia River.
- May 17 – The Buttonwood Agreement is signed, beginning the New York Stock Exchange.
- May 18 – War in Defence of the Constitution: Russia invades Poland.
- May 21 – 1792 Unzen earthquake and tsunami: An old lava dome collapses in Kyūshū, Japan, due to activity of Mount Unzen volcano; the resulting avalanche and tsunami kill about 14,300 people.
- May 29 – The Great Sejm of the Polish–Lithuanian Commonwealth is disbanded following the Russian invasion of Poland.
- June 1 – Kentucky becomes the 15th state of the United States of America.
- June 4 – Captain George Vancouver claims Puget Sound for Great Britain.
- June 13
  - Vancouver becomes the first European to enter Burrard Inlet.
  - Prussia declares war against France.

=== July–September ===
- July 18 – Polish–Russian War: Battle of Dubienka – Soldiers of the Polish–Lithuanian Commonwealth, led by Tadeusz Kościuszko, resist an attack from Imperial Russian Army forces five times their size.
- July 25 – Charles William Ferdinand, Duke of Brunswick, commander of the Allied army issues the Brunswick Manifesto threatening the Parisians with military execution and complete destruction should the French royal family be harmed in any way.
- August 10 – French Revolution: Insurrection of 10 August 1792 – The Tuileries Palace is stormed and Louis XVI is arrested and taken into custody.
- August 29–September 2 – War of the First Coalition: Battle of Verdun – Prussian forces defeat French troops led by Nicolas-Joseph Beaurepaire.
- August 21 – Royalist Louis Collenot d'Angremont becomes the first person executed by guillotine for political reasons, in Paris.
- September – Macartney Embassy: George Macartney, 1st Earl Macartney, sails from Portsmouth in HMS Lion as the first official envoy from Great Britain to China.
- September 2–7 – French Revolution: September Massacres – Rampaging mobs slaughter three Roman Catholic bishops and more than 200 priests, together with at least 1,000 other criminals.
- September 11 – Six men steal some of the former French Crown Jewels from a warehouse where the revolutionary government has stored them.
- September 12 – The town of Fort Borbon is founded by Governor Joaquín Alós y Bru. Nowadays it is called Fuerte Olimpo.
- September 14 – Radical antimonarchist Thomas Paine flees from England to France after being indicted for treason. He is tried in absentia during December and outlawed.

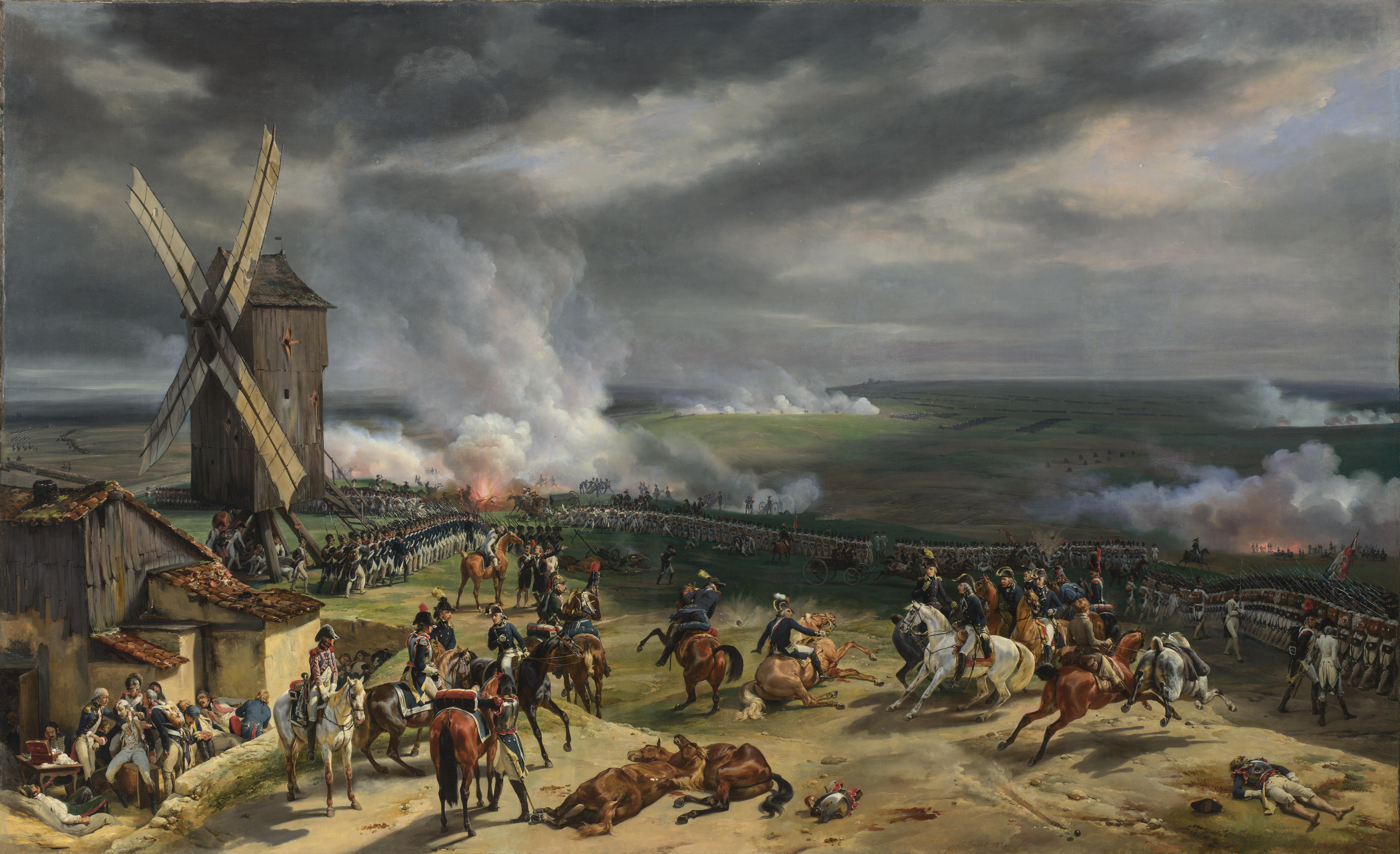
September 20: Battle of Valmy.

- September 20 – French Revolutionary Wars: Battle of Valmy – The French revolutionary army defeats the Prussians under the Duke of Brunswick after a 7-hour artillery duel.
- September 21 – French Revolution: A Proclamation of the abolition of the monarchy by the French Convention goes into effect, and the French First Republic is established, effective the following day.
- September 22 – French Revolution: The Era of the historical French Republican Calendar begins.
- September 30 – Chickamauga Cherokee launch an attack on Middle Tennessee to exterminate the White settlers; they are stopped at the opening battle at Buchanan's Station outside Nashboro.

=== October–December ===
- October 2 – The Baptist Missionary Society is founded in Kettering, England.
- October 3 – A militia departs from the Spanish stronghold of Valdivia to quell a Huilliche uprising in southern Chile.
- October 12 – The first Columbus Day celebration in the United States is held in New York City, 300 years after his arrival in the New World.
- October 13 – Foundation of Washington, D.C.: The cornerstone of the United States Executive Mansion (known as the White House after 1818) is laid.

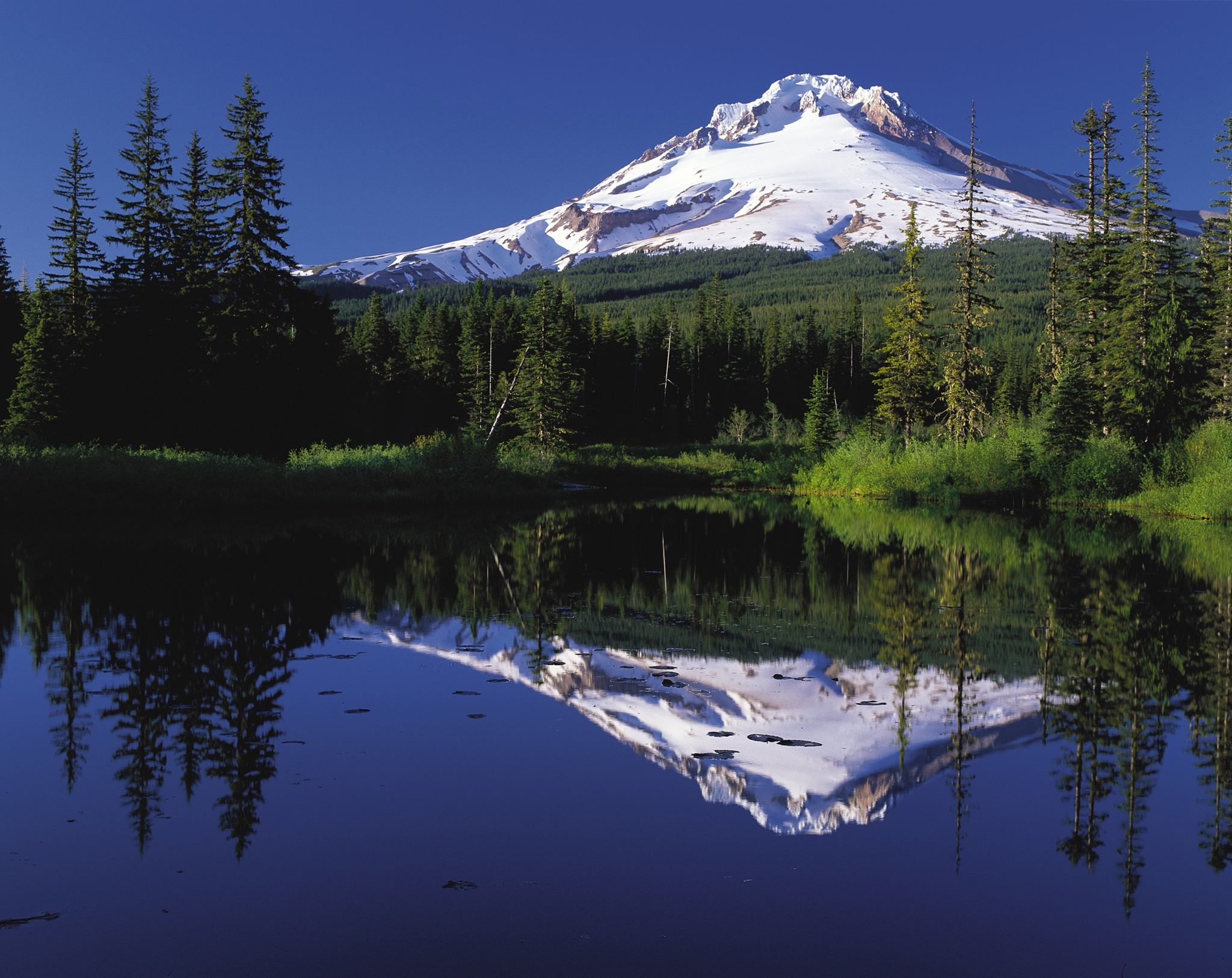
October 29: Mount Hood is named.

- October 29 – Mount Hood (Oregon) is named after British Admiral Lord Hood by Lt. William Broughton of the Vancouver Expedition, who spots the mountain near the mouth of the Willamette River.
- November 6
  - War of the First Coalition: Battle of Jemappes – Austrian armies under the command of Duke Albert of Saxe-Teschen are defeated in Belgium (at this time part of the Austrian Netherlands) by the French Army led by General Charles François Dumouriez.
  - The second United States presidential election is held. Incumbent President George Washington receives all 132 electoral votes for president, and incumbent Vice President John Adams is re-elected with 77 of 132 votes, with George Clinton receiving 50.
- November 19 – France's National Convention passes a resolution pledging French support for the overthrow of the governments of other nations.
- November 29 – War of the First Coalition: The Siege of Antwerp ends with the surrender of the Austrian garrison
- December 3 – George Washington is re-elected president of the United States.
- December 26 – The trial of Louis XVI of France begins.

=== Date unknown ===
- Tipu Sultan invades Kerala, India, but is repulsed.
- Hungarian astronomer Franz Xaver von Zach publishes The Tables of the Sun, an essential early work for navigation.
- Claude Chappe successfully demonstrates the first semaphore line, between Paris and Lille.
- Scottish engineer William Murdoch begins experimenting with gas lighting.
- George Anschutz constructs the first blast furnace in Pittsburgh, Pennsylvania.
- Mary Wollstonecraft's A Vindication of the Rights of Woman, one of the earliest works of feminist literature, is published in London.
- Barthélemy Catherine Joubert, future French general, becomes sub-lieutenant.
- Johann Georg Albrechtsberger becomes Kapellmeister in Vienna.
- The State Street Corporation is founded, in Boston, Massachusetts.
- The Insurance Company of North America (later Chubb) is founded in Philadelphia, Pennsylvania.
- Shiloh Meeting House, predecessor of Shiloh United Methodist Church in Lynchburg, Virginia, is founded.
- The first written examinations in Europe are held at the University of Cambridge in England.
- The composer Ludwig van Beethoven moves to Vienna from Bonn to study with Haydn. He would live in Vienna for the rest of his life.
- James Johnstone establishes that Vancouver Island is an island.

== Births ==
=== January–June ===
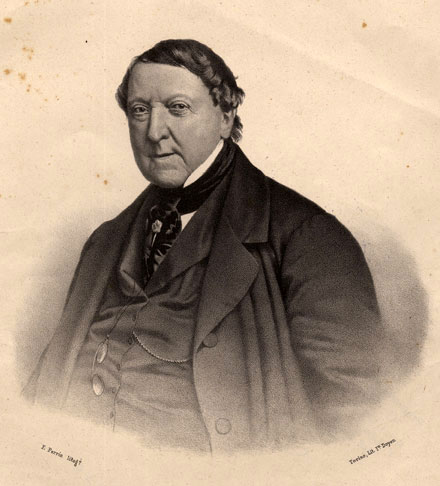
Gioachino Rossini

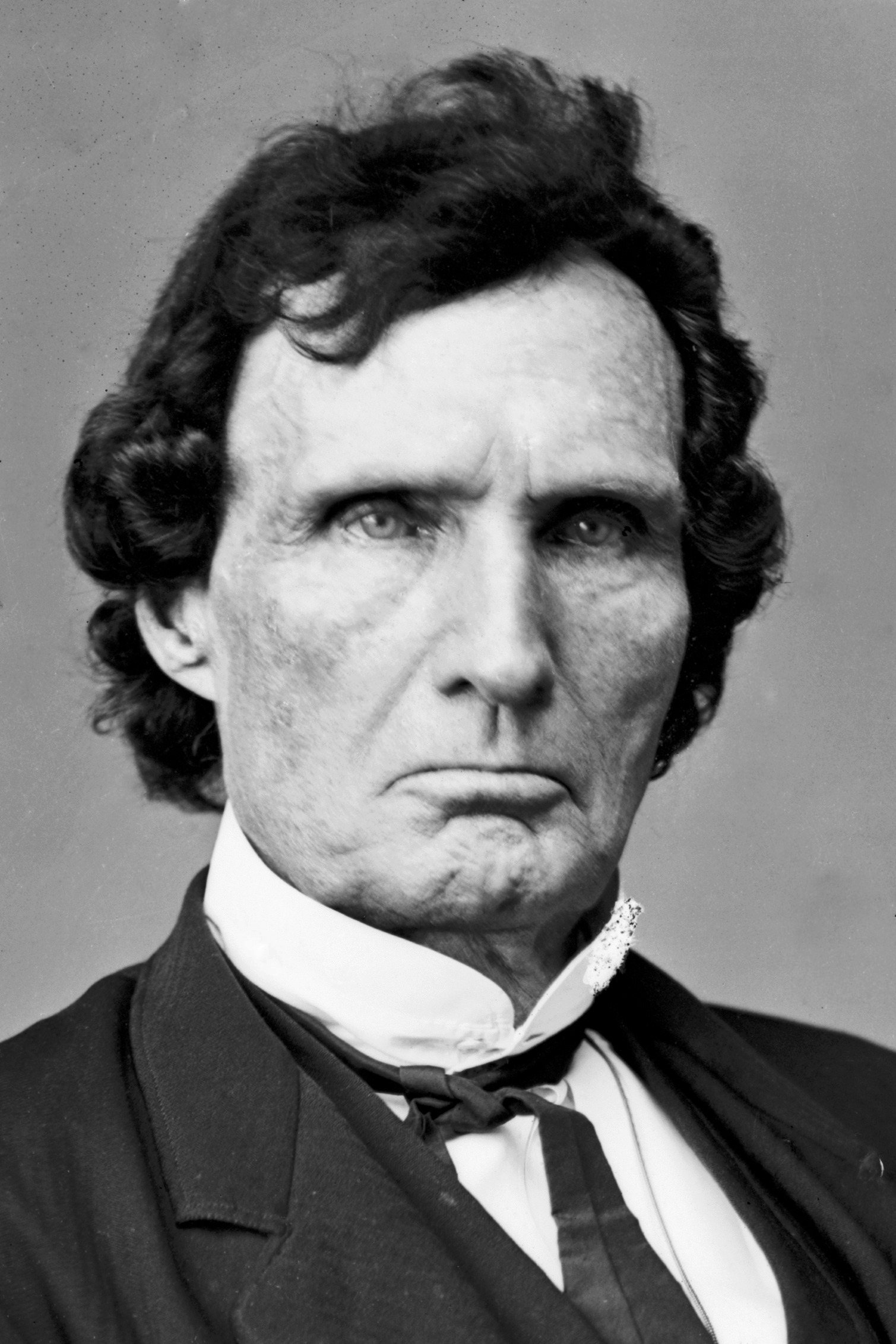
Thaddeus Stevens

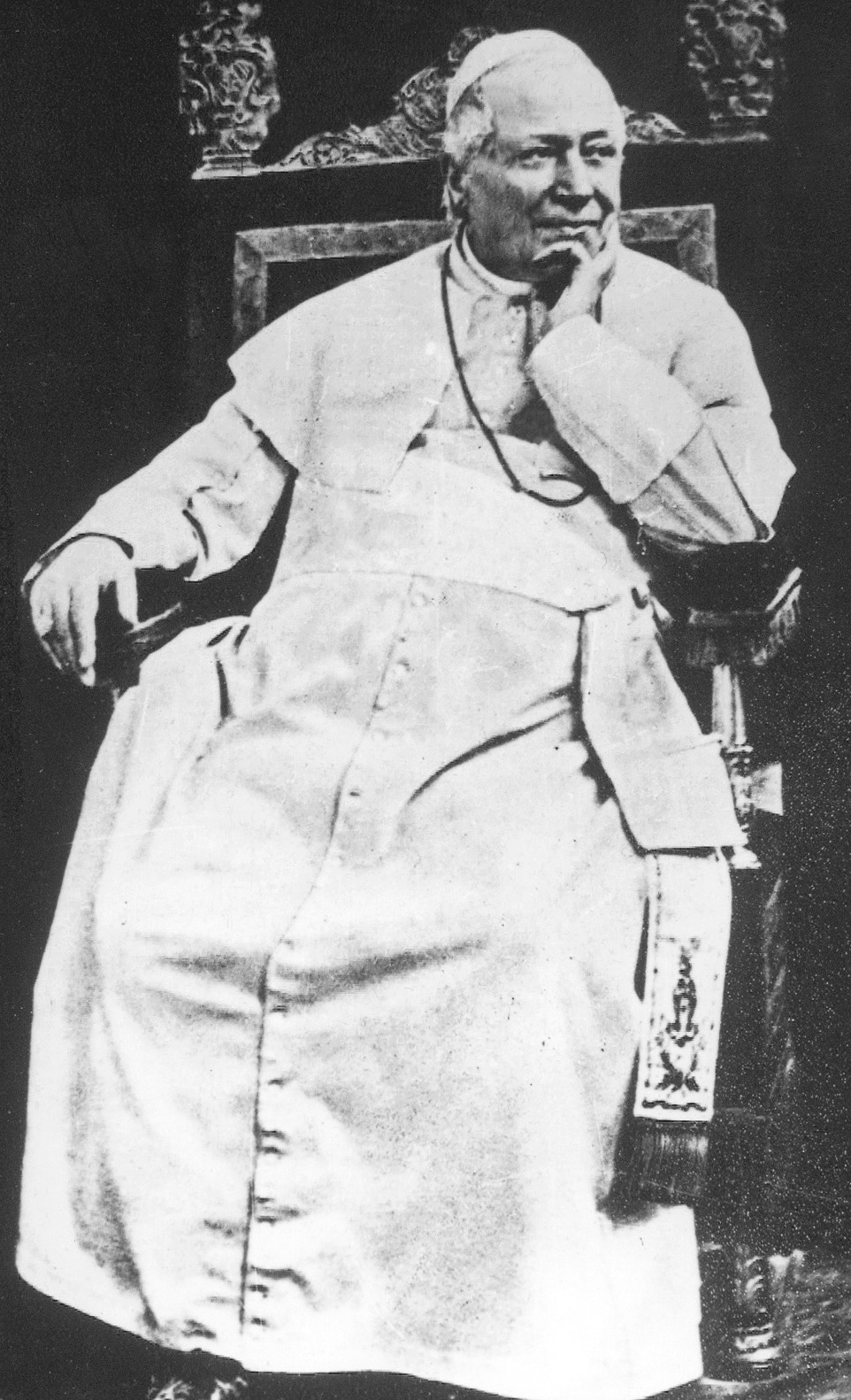
Pope Pius IX

- January 12 – Johann Arfvedson, Swedish chemist (d. 1841)
- February 17 – Karl Ernst von Baer, German naturalist (d. 1876)
- February 29 – Gioachino Rossini, Italian composer (d. 1868)
- March 3 – Johann Karl Ludwig Gieseler, German church historian (d. 1854)
- March 4
  - Isaac Lea, American conchologist, geologist and publisher (d. 1886)
  - Samuel Slocum, American inventor (d. 1861)
- March 7 – John Herschel, English mathematician and astronomer (d. 1871)
- April 1 – Karl Gottlob Zumpt, German classical scholar (d. 1849)
- April 2 – Francisco de Paula Santander, President of Colombia (d. 1840)
- April 4 – Thaddeus Stevens, American politician (d. 1868)
- April 23 – Thomas Romney Robinson, Irish astronomer and physicist (d. 1882)
- April 25 – John Keble, English churchman and poet (d. 1866)
- May 10 – Willie Person Mangum, American politician (d. 1861)
- May 13 – Pope Pius IX (b. Giovanni Mastai-Ferretti), Italian churchman (d. 1878)
- May 15 – James Mayer de Rothschild, German-born banker (d. 1868)
- May 17 – Anne Isabella Milbanke, English wife of Lord Byron (d. 1860)
- May 18 – Margaret Ann Neve, Guernesiaise supercentenarian (d. 1903)
- May 21 – Gaspard-Gustave Coriolis, French engineer and scientist (d. 1843)
- June 13 – William Austin Burt, American inventor, "father of the typewriter" (d. 1858)
- June 16 – John Linnell, English painter (d. 1882)
- June 21 – Ferdinand Christian Baur, German theologian (d. 1860)

=== July–December ===
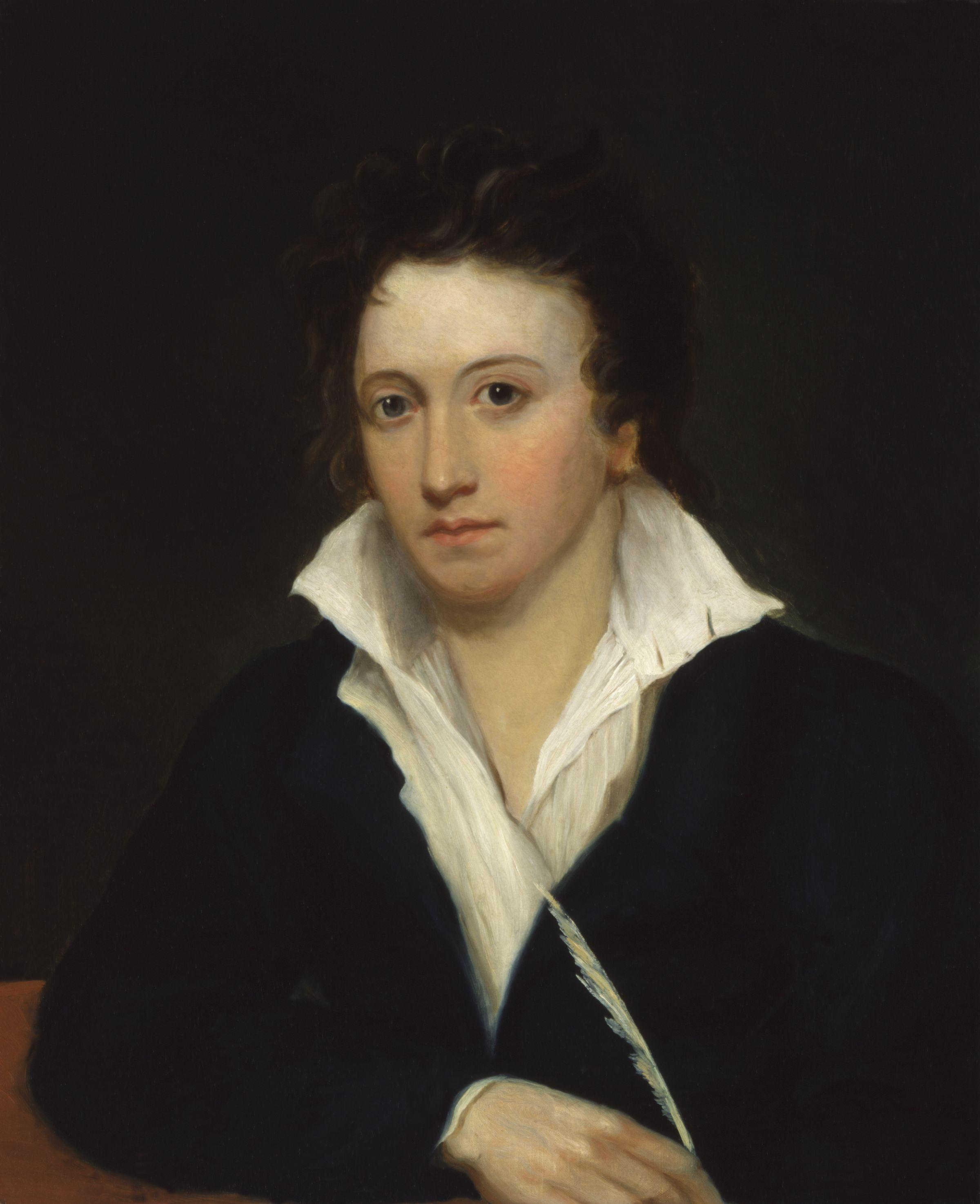
Percy Bysshe Shelley

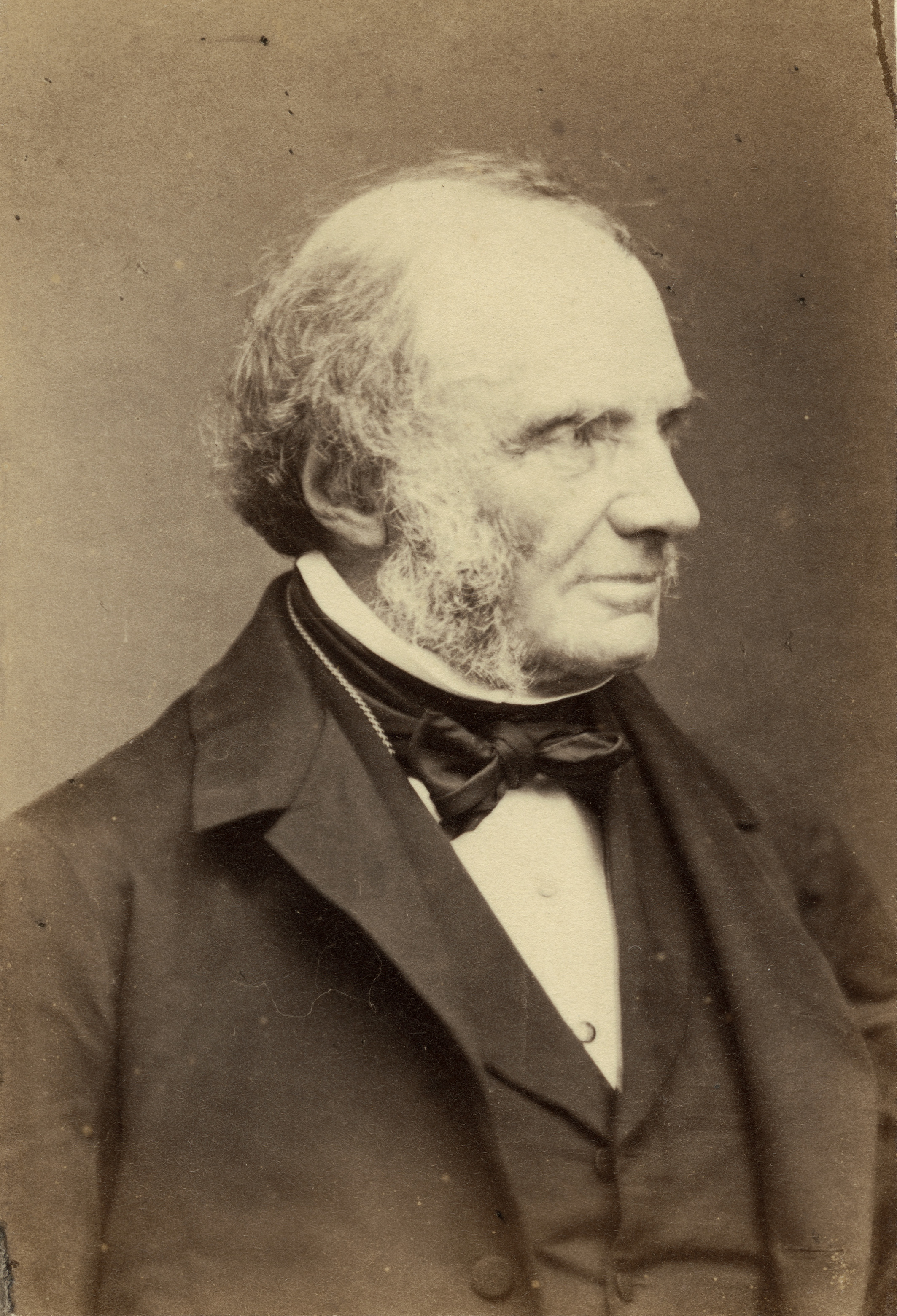
John Russell, 1st Earl Russell

- July 7 – William Henry Smith, English newsvendor and bookseller (d. 1865)
- July 10 – Frederick Marryat, British naval captain and novelist (d. 1848)
- July 27 – Maria Quitéria, Brazilian national heroine (d. 1853)
- August 4 – Percy Bysshe Shelley, English poet (d. 1822)
- August 13 – Adelaide of Saxe-Meiningen, queen of William IV of the United Kingdom (d. 1849)
- August 18 – John Russell, 1st Earl Russell, Prime Minister of the United Kingdom (d. 1878)
- August 22 – John Church Hamilton, American historian (d. 1882)
- August 26 – Manuel Oribe, 2nd President of Uruguay (d. 1857)
- September 2 – Vicente Ramón Roca, 3rd President of Ecuador (d. 1858)
- September 19 – William Backhouse Astor, Sr., American business tycoon (d. 1875)
- September 26 – William Hobson, first Governor of New Zealand (d. 1842)
- October 29 – Thomas Livingstone Mitchell, explorer, Surveyor-General of New South Wales, Australia (d. 1855)
- November 4 – Carlos Antonio López, president of Paraguay (d. 1862)
- November 10 – Samuel Nelson, Associate Justice of the Supreme Court of the United States (d. 1873)
- November 11 – Mary Anne Evans, wife of Benjamin Disraeli (d. 1872)
- November 28 – Victor Cousin, French philosopher (d. 1867)
- December 1 – Nikolai Lobachevsky, Russian mathematician (d. 1856)
- December 5 – Andrés de Santa Cruz, Peruvian military officer, seventh President of Peru and President of Bolivia (d. 1865)
- December 6 – William II of the Netherlands (d. 1849)
- date unknown – Nodira, Uzbek poet and stateswoman (d. 1842)

== Deaths ==
=== January–June ===
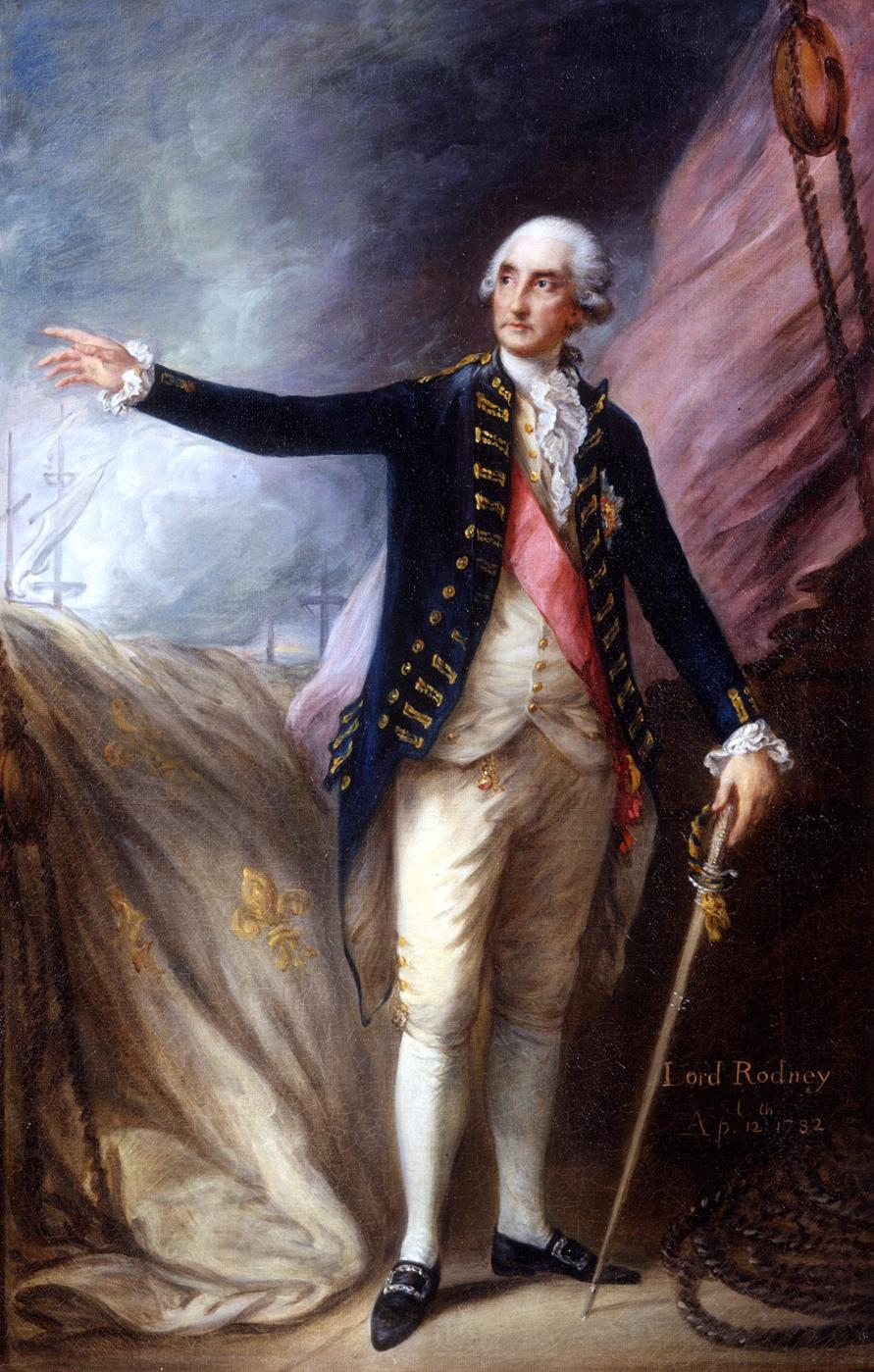
George Rodney, 1st Baron Rodney

- January 17 – George Horne, British academic and Bishop of Norwich (b.1730)
- February 15 – John Witherspoon, Scottish American signer of the Declaration of Independence (b. 1723)
- February 23 – Sir Joshua Reynolds, English painter (b. 1723)
- March 1
  - Leopold II, Holy Roman Emperor (b. 1747)
  - Angelo Emo, Venetian admiral and statesman (b. 1731)
  - Jean Godin des Odonais, French cartographer and naturalist (b. 1713)
- March 3 – Robert Adam, Scottish architect and designer (b. 1728)
- March 10 – John Stuart, 3rd Earl of Bute, Prime Minister of the United Kingdom (b. 1713)
- March 23 – Luís António Verney, Portuguese philosopher and pedagogue (b. 1713)
- March 29 – King Gustav III of Sweden (assassinated) (b. 1746)
- April 3 – Sir George Pocock, British admiral (b. 1706)
- April 4 – James Sykes, American politician (b. 1725)
- April 14 – Maximilian Hell, Slovak astronomer (b. 1720)
- April 20 – Matthias von Schoenberg, Catholic author (b. 1732)
- April 23 – Karl Friedrich Bahrdt, German theologian, adventurer (b. 1741)
- April 30 – John Montagu, 4th Earl of Sandwich, English statesman (b. 1718)
- May 10 – John Stevens, American delegate to the Continental Congress (b. c. 1715)
- May 12 – Charles Simon Favart, French dramatist (b. 1710)
- May 24 – George Rodney, 1st Baron Rodney, British naval officer (b. 1718)
- June 4 – John Burgoyne, British general (b. 1723)
- June 22 – Muhammad ibn Abd al-Wahhab, Arabian Wahhabi preacher (b. 1703)

=== July–December ===
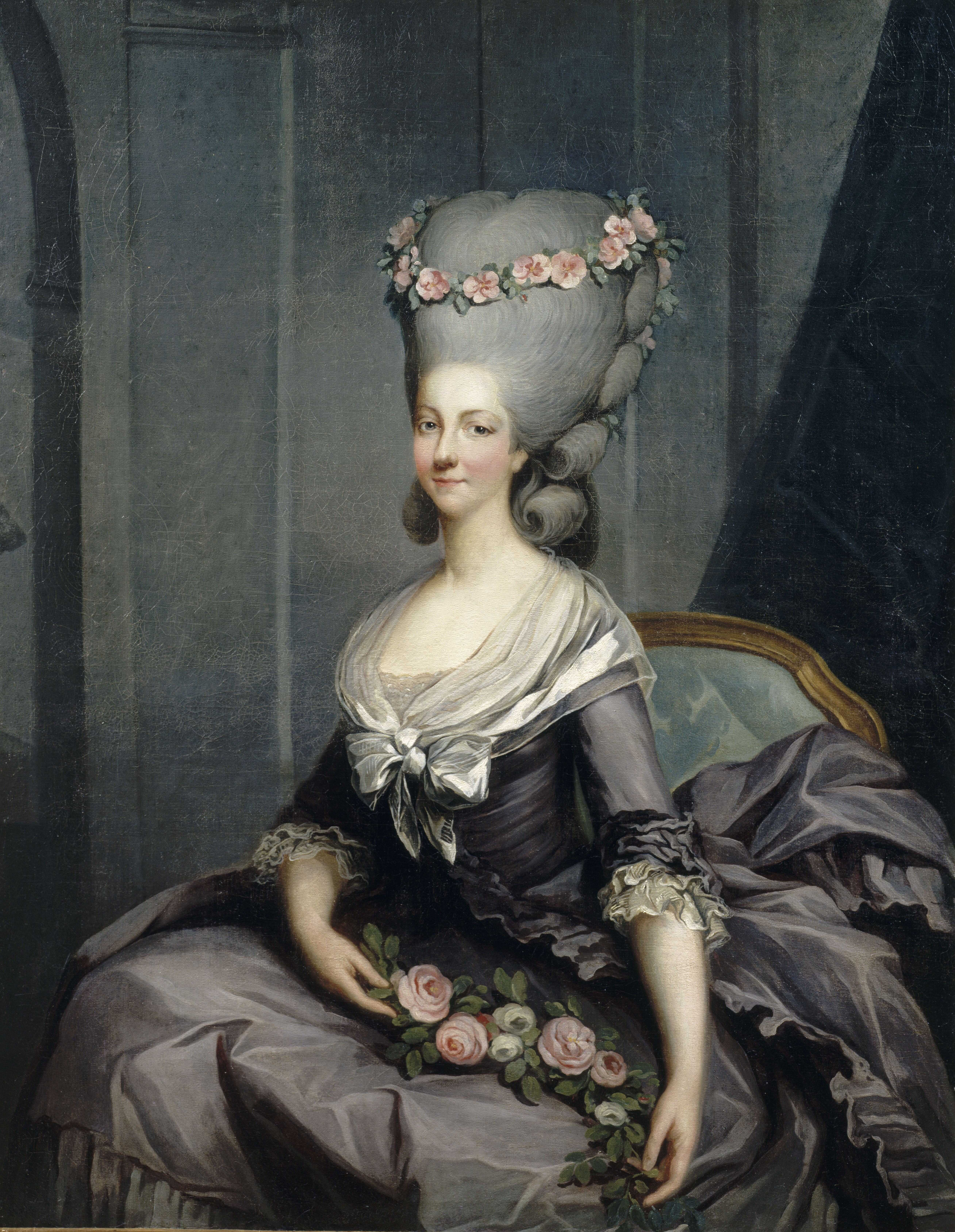
Marie Thérèse Louise of Savoy, Princesse de Lamballe

- July 3 – Duke Ferdinand of Brunswick-Wolfenbüttel (b. 1721)
- July 18 – John Paul Jones, American-born naval captain (b. 1747)
- July 21 – Richard Hancorne, British Royal Navy officer (b. 1754)
- July 29 – René Nicolas Charles Augustin de Maupeou, Chancellor of France (b. 1714)
- August 3 – Richard Arkwright, English inventor (b. 1732)
- August 4 – John Burgoyne, British army officer, playwright and politician (b. 1722)
- August 5 – Frederick North, Lord North, Prime Minister of Great Britain (b. 1732)
- September 3 – Marie Thérèse Louise of Savoy, Princesse de Lamballe, French princess, courtier to Marie Antoinette (killed in September Massacres) (b. 1749)
- September 8 – Charles d'Abancour, French statesman (killed in September Massacres) (b. 1758)
- September 16 – Nguyễn Huệ, Vietnamese emperor (b. 1753)
- September 18 – August Gottlieb Spangenberg, German religious leader (b. 1704)
- September 25 – Adam Gottlob Moltke, Danish statesman (b. 1710)
- September 29 – George Browne, Russian-Irish field-marshal (b. 1698)
- October 7 – George Mason, American patriot (b. 1725)
- October 14 – Sophie Charlotte Ackermann, German actress (b. 1714)
- October 21 – Anders Rudolf du Rietz, Swedish general, count and politician (b. 1722)
- October 22 – Guillaume Le Gentil, French astronomer (b. 1725)
- October 28
  - Paul Möhring, German physician and scientist (b. 1710)
  - John Smeaton, English civil engineer (b. 1724)
- November – Samuel Hearne, English explorer, fur-trader, author and naturalist (b. 1745)
- December 7 – Marie Jeanne Riccoboni (Laboras de Mezières), French novelist (b. 1714)
- December 8 – Henry Laurens, political leader during the American Revolutionary War, father of John Laurens (b. 1724)
- December 15
  - Joseph Martin Kraus, Swedish composer (b. 1756)
  - Hugh Pigot, British Royal Navy admiral (b. 1722)
