= Wilhelm Abraham Teller =

German Protestant theologian (1734–1804)

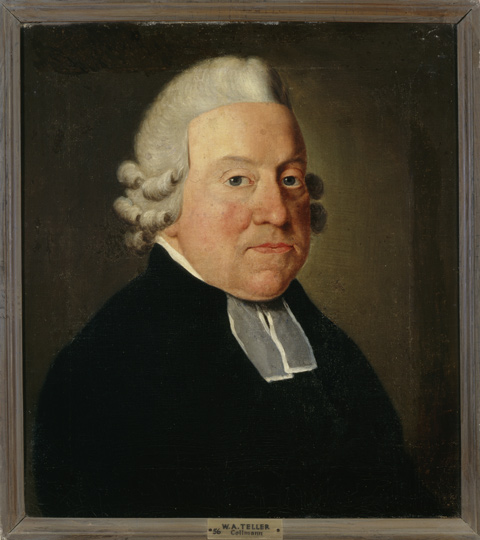
Wilhelm Abraham Teller in 1795

Wilhelm Abraham Teller (9 January 1734 – 9 December 1804) was a German Protestant theologian who championed a rational approach to Christianity.

== Life and career ==
Teller was born in Leipzig. His father, Romanus Teller (1703–1750), was a pastor at Leipzig, and afterwards became professor of theology in the University of Leipzig. He edited the earlier volumes of a Bibelwerk ("Bible Book", 19 volumes, 1749–1770) which was designed as an adaptation for German readers of the exegetical works of Andrew Willet, Henry Ainsworth, Simon Patrick, Matthew Poole, Matthew Henry and others. Wilhelm Abraham studied philosophy and theology in the university of his native town. Amongst the men whose influence mainly determined his theological position and line of work was Johann August Ernesti.

Teller's writings presented rationalism in its course of development from biblical supernaturalism to the borders of deistical naturalism. His first learned production was a Latin translation of Benjamin Kennicott's Dissertation on the State of the Printed Hebrew Text of the Old Testament (1756), which was followed the next year by an essay in which he expounded his own critical principles.

In 1761 he was appointed pastor, professor of theology and general superintendent in the University of Helmstedt. Here he pursued his exegetical, theological and historical researches, the results of which appeared in his Lehrbuch des christlichen Glaubens ("Textbook of Christian Faith", 1764). This work caused some commotion, as much by the novelty of its method as by the heterodoxy of its matter, and more by its omissions than by its positive teaching, though everywhere the author sought to put theological doctrines in a decidedly modern form.

In 1767 Teller, whose attitude had made his position at Helmstedt intolerable, accepted an invitation from the Prussian minister for ecclesiastical affairs to the post of provost of Cölln, with a seat in the Lutheran Supreme Consistory of Berlin. Here he found himself in the company of the rationalistic theologians of Prussia: Friedrich Samuel Gottfried Sack (1738–1817), Johann Joachim Spalding (1714–1804) and others and became one of the leaders of the rationalistic party, and one of the chief contributors to CF Nicolai's Allgemeine Deutsche Bibliothek. Teller was not long in making use of his freer position in Berlin.

In 1772 appeared the most popular of his books, Wörterbuch des Neuen Testamentes zur Erklärung der christlichen Lehre ("Dictionary of the New Testament for the Explanation of Christian Doctrine", 6th ed., 1805). The object of this work was to recast the language and ideas of the New Testament and give them the form of 18th-century Enlightenment theology. The author maintains that the Graeco-Hebraic expressions must not be interpreted literally but explained in terms intelligible to the modern mind. By this lexicon Teller had put himself amongst the most advanced rationalists, and his opponents charged him with the design of overthrowing positive Christianity altogether. In 1786 the author became a member of the Berlin Academy of Sciences.

The Wollner Edict of 9 July 1788, for the enforcement of Lutheran orthodoxy, and Teller's action, as member of the consistorial council, in defiance of it (cf. his Wohlgemeinte Erinnerungen, "Well-Meaning Reminders", 1788), led the Prussian government to pass upon him the sentence of suspension for three months, with forfeiture of his stipend. He was not, however, moved by such means, and (1792) issued his work Die Religion der Vollkommeneren ("The Religion of the More Perfect"), an exposition of his theological position, in which he advocated at length the idea, subsequently often urged, of the perfectibility of Christianity, that is, of the ultimate transformation of Christianity into a scheme of simple morality, with a complete rejection of all specifically Christian ideas and methods. This book represented the culminating point of German Enlightenment theology and is separated by a long process of development from the author's Lehrbuch. In the same year he published his Anleitung zur Religion überhaupt und zum Allgemeinen des Christenthums besonders; für die Jugend höherer und gebildeter Stünde aller Religions parteien ("Manual of All Religion and the Generalities of Christianity Especially; for the Youth of Upper and Educated Classes of all Religious Denominations").

Besides his contributions to the Allgemeine Deutsche Bibliothek, he edited a popular and practically useful Magazin für Prediger ("Magazine for Preachers", 1792–1801).

He died in Berlin.
