= Zumpt =

Zumpt is a surname. Notable people with the surname include:

- Karl Gottlob Zumpt (1792–1894), German classical scholar
- August Wilhelm Zumpt (1815–1887), German classical scholar, nephew of Karl
- Fritz Konrad Ernst Zumpt (1908–1985), German entomologist
