= Sack =

A sack usually refers to a rectangular-shaped bag.

Sack or sacking may also refer to:

== Bags ==
- Flour sack
- Gunny sack
- Hacky sack, sport
- Money sack
- Paper sack
- Sleeping bag
- Stuff sack
- Knapsack

== Other uses ==
- Bed, a slang term
- Sack (band), an Irish band
- Sack (comics), a Marvel Comics villain
- Sack (surname), a surname
- Sack (unit), an English unit of weight or mass used for coal and wool
- Sack (wine), a type of white fortified wine
- Sack, Zurich, a village in the Swiss canton of Zurich
- Sacks (surname)
- "Sacked" (The Detectives), a 1996 television episode
- Sackcloth (Hebrew sak), a fabric mentioned in the Bible
- Selective acknowledgement (SACK), in computer networking
- Ball sack, slang for scrotum
- Dismissal (employment), slang term for being fired
- Looting, the indiscriminate taking of goods by force, particularly during war
- Quarterback sack, tackling the quarterback behind the line of scrimmage in American and Canadian football
- Sack jacket, another term for a lounge jacket

== See also ==
- Sack of Rome (disambiguation)
- Sacking out, horse-training method
- Sad Sack, American fictional comic strip and comic book character created by Sgt. George Baker during World War II
- Sock (disambiguation)
- Sach, a Vietnamese ethnic group
