= Karl Lachmann =

German philologist and critic (1793–1851)

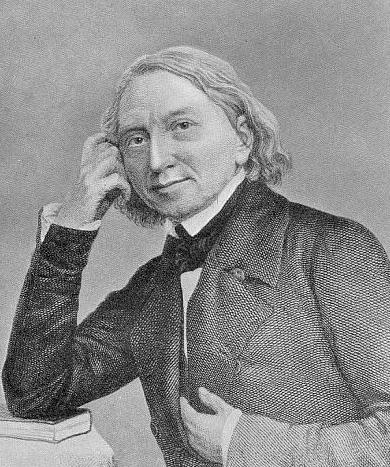
Karl Lachmann

Karl Konrad Friedrich Wilhelm Lachmann (German: [ˈlaxman]; 4 March 1793 – 13 March 1851) was a German philologist and critic. He is particularly noted for his foundational contributions to the field of textual criticism.

== Biography ==
Lachmann was born in Brunswick, in present-day Lower Saxony. He studied at Leipzig and Göttingen, devoting himself mainly to philological studies. In Göttingen, he founded a critical and philological society in 1811, in conjunction with Dissen, Schulze, and Bunsen. In 1815, he joined the Prussian army as a volunteer chasseur and accompanied his detachment to Paris, but did not see active service. In 1816, he became an assistant master in the Friedrichswerder gymnasium at Berlin, and a Privatdozent at the university. The same summer he became one of the principal masters in the Friedrichs-Gymnasium of Königsberg, where he assisted his colleague, the Germanist Friedrich Karl Köpke, with his edition of Rudolf von Ems' Barlaam und Josaphat (1818), and also assisted his friend in a contemplated edition of the works of Walther von der Vogelweide.

In January 1818, he became professor extraordinarius of classical philology in the University of Königsberg, and at the same time began to lecture on Old High German grammar and the Middle High German poets. He devoted himself during the following seven years to an extraordinarily detailed study of those subjects, and in 1824, obtained a leave of absence in order to search the libraries of central and southern Germany for further materials.

In 1825, Lachmann was nominated extraordinary professor of classical and German philology at the Humboldt University, Berlin (ordinary professor 1827); in 1830, he was admitted as a member of the Academy of Sciences. He died in Berlin.

== Importance in scholarship ==
Lachmann is a figure of considerable importance in the history of German philology.

Early in his career, Lachmann translated the first volume of P.E. Müller's Sagabibliothek des skandinavischen Altertums (1816). In his "Habilitationsschrift" über die ursprungliche Gestalt des Gedichts von der Nibelungen Noth (1816), and in his review of Hagen's Nibelungen and Benecke's Bonerius, contributed in 1817 to the Jenaische Literaturzeitung, he had already laid down the rules of textual criticism and elucidated the phonetic and metrical principles of Middle High German in a manner which marked a distinct advance in that branch of investigation.

The rigidly scientific character of his method becomes increasingly apparent in the Auswahl aus den hochdeutschen Dichtern des dreizehnten Jahrhunderts (1820); in the edition of Hartmann's Iwein (1827); in those of Walther von der Vogelweide (1827) and Wolfram von Eschenbach (1833); in the papers "Über das Hildebrandslied," "Über althochdeutsche Betonung und Verskunst," "Über den Eingang des Parzivals," and "Über drei Bruchstücke niederrheinischer Gedichte" published in the Abhandlungen of the Berlin Academy; and in Der Nibelunge Not und die Klage (1826), which was followed by a critical commentary in 1836.

Lachmann's Betrachtungen über Homer's Iliad, first published in the Abhandlungen of the Berlin Academy in 1837 and 1841, in which he sought to show that the Iliad consists of eighteen independent "layers" variously enlarged and interpolated, had considerable influence on 19th century Homeric scholarship, although his views were later not accepted.

His smaller edition of the New Testament appeared in 1831, the 3rd edition in 1846, and the larger second edition, in two volumes, between 1842 and 1850. The plan of Lachmann's edition, which he explained in Theologische Studien und Kritiken (1830), is a modification of the unaccomplished project of Richard Bentley (formulated in 1720) to establish a more reliable critical Greek edition of the New Testament than the Textus Receptus. Lachmann was the first major editor to break from the Textus Receptus, seeking to restore the most ancient reading current in manuscripts of the Alexandrian text-type, using the agreement of the Western authorities (Old Latin and Greek Western Uncials) as the main proof of antiquity of a reading where the oldest Alexandrian authorities differ.

Lachmann's edition of Lucretius (1850), which was the principal occupation of his life from 1845, is perhaps his greatest achievement of scholarship. He demonstrated how the three main manuscripts all derived from one archetype, containing 302 pages of 26 lines to a page. Further, he was able to show that this archetype was a copy of a manuscript written in a minuscule hand, which was in turn a copy of a manuscript of the 4th or 5th centuries written in rustic capitals. To say his recreation of the text was "accepted" is an understatement; HAJ Munro characterized this accomplishment as "a work which will be a landmark for scholars as long as the Latin language continues to be studied." Lachmann also edited Propertius (1816); Catullus (1829); Tibullus (1829); Genesius (1834); Terentianus Maurus (1836); Babrius (1845); Avianus (1845); Gaius (1841–1842); the Agrimensores Romani (1848–1852); and Lucilius (edited after his death by Vahlen, 1876). He also translated Shakespeare's sonnets (1820) and Macbeth (1829).

== See also ==
- Lachmann's law
