= Friedrich Karl Köpke =

Friedrich Karl Ludwig Köpke, also spelt Koepke (19 March 1785 – 15 March 1865 in Berlin) was a German schoolmaster who specialized in Germanic studies.

== Early life and education ==
Born in Medow, a town near Anklam, in Swedish Pomerania, Köpke went to the village school there, but his father also taught him, to supplement his education. At the age of ten, he was sent to live with a maternal uncle named Hasselbach, in Anklam, to attend the Latin school there. He went on to study philology at the University of Halle, receiving his doctorate at Erfurt in 1808.

== Career ==
In 1810, Köpke was appointed as a senior instructor at the Collegium Fridericianum in Königsberg. From 1817 to 1857 he was a schoolmaster at the Joachimsthal Gymnasium in Berlin, under the directorships of Bernhard Moritz Snethlage and August Meineke.

== Death ==
Köpke was buried at the Matthäus-Kirche in Tiergarten, Berlin, on 19 March 1865, when his age was recorded as 78 years, two months, and 26 days.

== Published works ==
Köpke was the editor of a collection of 13th century legends titled "Das Passional : eine Legenden-Sammlung des dreizehnten Jahrhunderts" (1852). Other noted works by Köpke include:

- "Barlaam und Josaphat, von Rudolf von Montfort", (1818) – An edition of Rudolf von Ems' "Barlaam and Josaphat".
- "Geschichte der Bibliothek des königl. joachimsthalschen Gymnasiums : nebst einigen Beilagen", (1831) – History of the library at the Joachimsthal Gymnasium.
