= Robert Sack =

Robert Sack may refer to:

- Robert D. Sack, American judge
- Robert L. Sack, American physician and researcher
