= Snethlage =

Snethlage may refer to:

- Edu Snethlage (1883–1941), Dutch association football player
- Emilie Snethlage (1868–1929), German-born Brazilian naturalist and ornithologist
- Emil Heinrich Snethlage (1897–1939), German naturalist and ethnographer (nephew of Emilie Snethlage)
- Bernhard Moritz Snethlage (1753–1840), German educator

See also

- Snethlage's antpitta, a species of antpitta in the family Grallariidae
- Snethlage's tody-tyrant, a species of bird in the family Tyrannidae
- Chestnut-belted gnateater, also known as Snethlage's gnateater, a species of bird in the family Conopophagidae
- Emilia's marmoset, also known as Snethlage's marmoset, a marmoset endemic to Brazil
