= Johann Joachim Spalding =

German Protestant theologian and philosopher

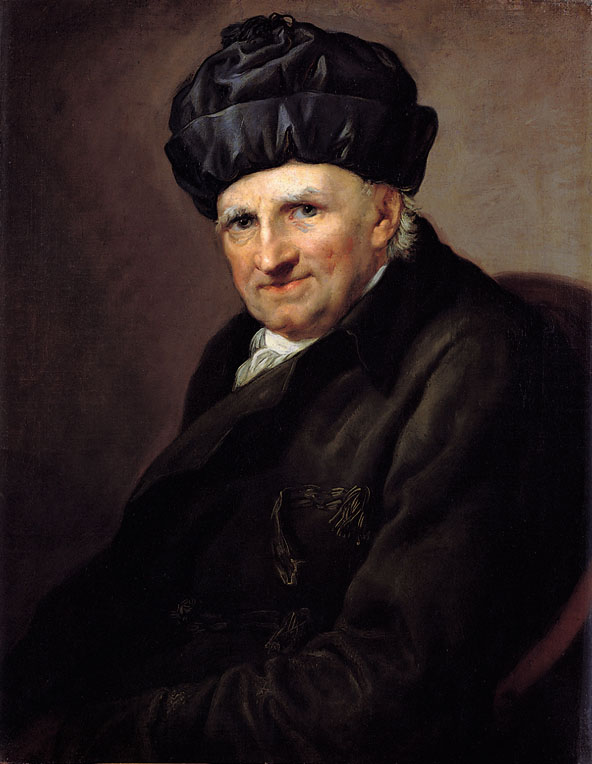
Johann Joachim Spalding (1714-1804)

Johann Joachim Spalding (1 November 1714 – 25 May 1804) was a German Protestant theologian and philosopher of Scottish ancestry who was a native of Tribsees, Swedish Pomerania. He was the father of Georg Ludwig Spalding, a professor at Grauen Kloster in Berlin.

== Biography ==
He grew up as a son of the parish priest Johann Georg Spalding (1681–1748) in Tribsees and studied himself philosophy and theology at the Universities of Rostock and Greifswald, afterwards working as an auxiliary preacher in his hometown of Tribsees. Spalding's grandfather Johann Spalding (1633–1686), was mayor of Malchin in the Duchy of Mecklenburg. The Spalding family had Scottish ancestors. In 1755, he became a pastor in Lassan, and two years later, he served as a minister in the town of Barth.

In 1764, he received the titles of provost and Oberkonsistorialrat, and he gained recognition for his sermons at St. Nicolai-Kirche and at Marienkirche in Berlin. He was a highly influential minister who had as friends, renowned personalities that included Ewald Christian von Kleist and Johann Wilhelm Ludwig Gleim. As a protest against the Wöllnersche Religionsedikt (Wöllner Edict of 9 July 1788), he resigned from his official duties.

Spalding was an important figure of the German Enlightenment. In 1748 he released Betrachtungen über die Bestimmung des Menschen (Reflections on the Destination of Man), a publication that is considered to be a manifesto of German Enlightenment theology. In this work he rejected dogmatic authoritarianism and confessional orthodoxy, while promoting a common sense philosophy that explained an individual's path from sensuality to spirituality ultimately leading to immortality.

In his writings he strongly opposed Julien Offroy de La Mettrie's philosophy of French materialism. His autobiography, Lebensbeschreibung, von ihm selbst aufgesetzt, was published by his son in 1804. Other noted works by Spalding include:

== Family ==
Johann Joachim Spalding was married Wilhelmine Gebhardi (1734–1762), granddaughter of the Greifswald professor Heinrich Brandanus Gebhardi (1657–1729). The couple had three sons and three daughters, including the future jurist Karl August Wilhelm Spalding (1760–1830), the philologist Georg Ludwig Spalding (1762–1811), who was a professor at the Gray Monastery, and Johanna Wilhemine Spalding (1753–1832), who was married the theologian Friedrich Samuel Gottfried Sack (1738–1817), who was a son himself of Reformed preacher August Friedrich Wilhelm Sack (1703–1786).

== Literature ==
- Über die Nutzbarkeit des Predigtamtes und deren Beförderung, 1772.
- Gedanken über den Werth der Gefühle in dem Christenthum, 1789 – Thoughts concerning the value of feelings in Christianity.
- Vertraute Briefe, die Religion betreffend : (1784; 1785; 1788) – Familiar writings involving religion.
- Religion, eine Angelegenheit des Menschen, 1798 – Religion, A matter for mankind.
