= Alfred J. Lewy =

American sleep researcher

Alfred J. Lewy, a.k.a. "Sandy Lewy", is an American sleep researcher.

== Career ==
He graduated from the University of Chicago in 1973 after studying Psychiatry, Pharmacology and Ophthalmology. He is a full professor and Vice-Chair of the department of Psychiatry at the Oregon Health & Science University and holds an MD and PhD. Prior to moving to Oregon in 1981, Lewy was at the National Institute of Mental Health (NIMH) in Bethesda, Maryland, working with senior colleague Thomas Wehr. In Oregon he has worked closely with Robert L. Sack. As of December 2005, he had 94 publications available on PubMed.

== Research ==
He describes his research as follows:

"My laboratory studies chronobiologic sleep and mood disorders. These disorders include winter depression, jet lag, maladaptation to shift work and certain types of sleep disturbances. Relying on a very precise assay for plasma melatonin (a hormone that has a clearly defined 24-hour pattern of secretion), biological rhythm disorders can be assessed and their treatment can be monitored. Current research is focused on developing bright light exposure and melatonin administration as treatment modalities for these disorders. Treatment must be precisely scheduled. Morning light exposure and evening melatonin administration cause circadian phase-advance shifts; evening light exposure and morning melatonin administration cause circadian phase-delay shifts. Totally blind individuals have 25-hour circadian rhythms, drifting an hour later each day, unless they take a melatonin capsule at a certain time every day."
