= Georg Ludwig Spalding =

German philologist

Georg Ludwig Spalding (8 April 1762 – 7 June 1811) was a German philologist born in Barth, Mecklenburg-Vorpommern. He was the son of theologian Johann Joachim Spalding (1714–1804).

He studied philology and theology at the Universities of Göttingen and Halle, afterwards taking an extended journey through France, England and the Netherlands. From 1787 onward, he taught classes at Grauen Kloster in Berlin.

Spalding's best written work was an edition of Quintilian's Institutio oratoria, being credited for publishing its first three volumes. Philipp Karl Buttmann (1764–1829) published the fourth volume after Spalding's death, with Karl Gottlob Zumpt (1792–1849) and Eduard Bonnell (1802–1877) continuing the series with edition of Volumes V and VI. Two other noteworthy publications by Spalding are Vindiciae philosophorum megaricorum (1792) and Midiana des Demosthenes (1794), the latter work being revised in 1823 by Philipp Buttmann.
