= August Wilhelm Zumpt =

German classical scholar

- Born: 4 December 1815; Königsberg, Kingdom of Prussia
- Died: 22 April 1877 (aged 61); Berlin, German Empire

Academic background
- Education: University of Berlin
- Influences: Karl Ferdinand Ranke

Academic work
- Discipline: Epigraphy
- Institutions: Friedrich-Wilhelms-Gymnasium

August Wilhelm Zumpt (4 December 1815 – 22 April 1877 in Berlin) was a German classical scholar, known chiefly in connection with Latin epigraphy. He was a nephew of philologist Karl Gottlob Zumpt.

Born in Königsberg, Zumpt studied at the University of Berlin (1832–36). From 1839 to 1851, he was a professor at Friedrich Werder Gymnasium (Berlin), afterwards working as a professor at Friedrich-Wilhelms-Gymnasium under the direction of Karl Ferdinand Ranke. He travelled extensively during his career; England (1845, 1860), Italy (1851, 1857, 1864), Greece, Egypt, Palestine and Asia Minor (1871–72).

His papers on epigraphy (collected in "Commentationes epigraphicae", 2 vols., 1850, 1854) brought him into conflict with Theodor Mommsen in connexion with the preparation of the Corpus Inscriptionum Latinarum, a scheme for which, drawn up by Mommsen, was approved in 1847.

== Works ==
- Edition of Rutilius Claudius Namatianus, "De Reditu Suo Libri Duo" (1840).
- "De Augustalibus et Seviris Augustalibus commentatio epigraphica" (1846).
- "Caesaris Augusti index rerum a se gestarum sive monumentum Ancyranum" (with Johannes Franck, 1845).
- "Augusti Wilhelmi Zumptii Commentationum epigraphicarum ad antiquitates Romanas pertinentium" (two volumes 1850, 1854).
- Das Criminalrecht der römischen Republik (two volumes 1865, 1869).
- Editions of Cicero; "Oratio pro L. Murena" (1859) and "Orationes Tres de lege agraria" (1861).
- "De monumento Ancyrano supplendo commantatio" (1869).
- Der Criminalprocess der römischen Republik (1871).

Wilhelm Ihne incorporated materials left by him in the seventh and eighth volumes of his "Römische Geschichte".
