= Bradley Sack =

American physician and researcher

Richard Bradley Sack
- Born: October 25, 1935; Le Sueur, Minnesota
- Died: April 24, 2017 (aged 81); Lutherville, Maryland
- Education: University of Oregon School of Medicine
- Known for: cholera research
- Spouse: Jo Nystrom

Richard Bradley Sack (October 25, 1935 – April 24, 2017) was an American physician and researcher noted for his contributions to the treatment of cholera.

== Early years ==
Sack was born in Le Sueur, Minnesota to Wilma Mary (Hyink) and Rev. Nobel V. Sack. He grew up in Iowa and graduated from Lewis & Clark College. He then attended the University of Oregon School of Medicine, where he graduated in 1960.

== Career ==
Sack did his residency at the University of Washington, followed by a fellowship with the Johns Hopkins Bloomberg School of Public Health. Sack joined the Johns Hopkins faculty in 1962. Sack's lab first identified Enterotoxigenic Escherichia coli, a bacterium that is a major cause of diarrhea. He established two research centers funded by the NIH, one in Lima, Peru and one in the White Mountain Apache Reservation in Whiteriver, Arizona. He co-authored over 350 peer-reviewed publications.

== Family ==
He was the brother of Robert L. Sack.
