= Privy Councillor Simon Heinrich Sack Family Foundation =

German foundation

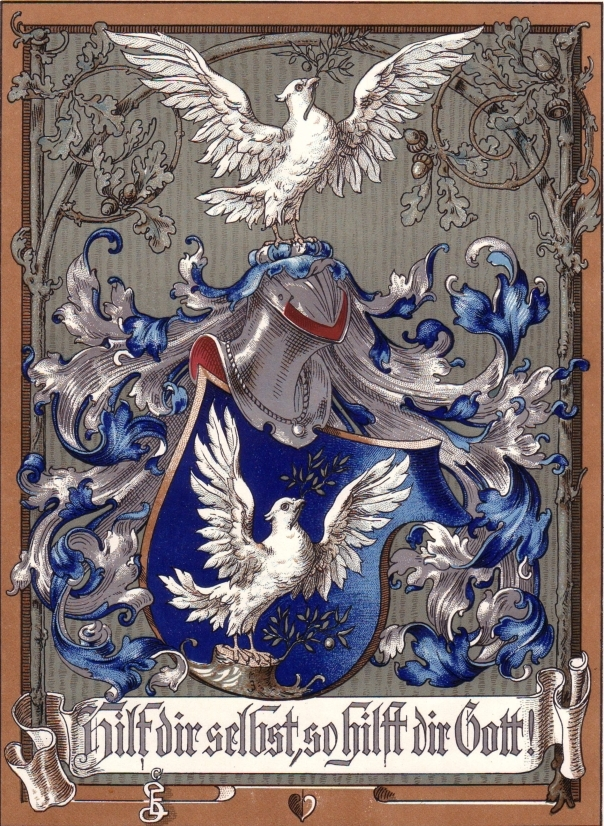
Coat of Arms of the Simon Heinrich Sack Foundation

The Privy Councillor Simon Heinrich Sack Foundation or Hofrat Simon Heinrich Sack'sche Familienstiftung (as it is named in German) was founded by Simon Heinrich Sack, son of the royal court chaplain Friedrich Ernst Sack from Hecklingen. After his studies in Law in Halle and Frankfurt/Oder at the age of 27, he became Court and Justice Councillor in Glogau and Privy Councilor (Hofrat) to Frederick the Great. As a lawyer he enjoyed the trust of the Schlesien nobility and due to his integrity and impartiality became involved in the difficult ownership changes and after the Schlesien Wars and the Seven Years' War he was able to accrue considerable wealth.

== Person und Family of the Foundation ==
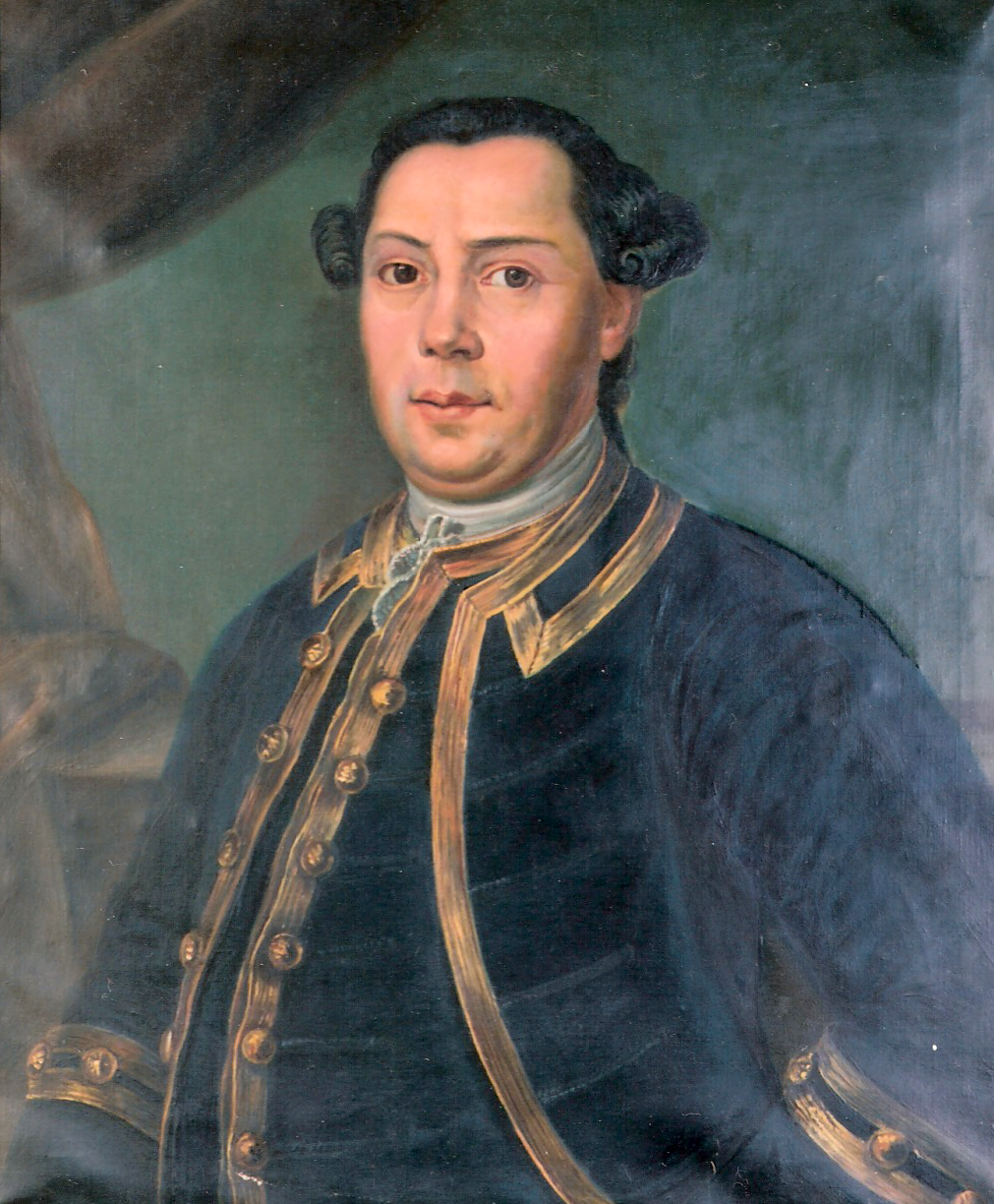
Simon Heinrich Sack

Simon Heinrich Sack was not married and therefore had no children of his own. He did apparently have an illegitimate child with his housekeeper Anna Maria Biesler (1735–1799) (although the identity of the actual mother is still a matter of dispute and no exact records have been found). Her name was Louise Ernestine Biesler (1757–1831) and Simon Heinrich raised her as a foster daughter adopting her legally in 1774. She later married the Privy Councillor Carl Cramer from Glogau and thus took the name of her husband, "Cramer“.

After the death of his oldest brother in 1777, the preacher Friedrich Leberecht Sack from Pasewalk, Simon Heinrich Sack took over the care of his brother's children.

== Establishment of the Foundation ==
Simon Heinrich Sack established the foundation in 1781 for the benefit of the descendants of his father, Friedrich Ernst Sack (1676–1783) (Ernestinian Line), August Friedrich Wilhelm Sack (Wilhelm Line) as well as of his adopted daughter Louise Ernestine Cramer (1757–1831) (Cramer Line).

In the year 1789 the foundation was recognized by "landesherrlichen Konsenz" (state agreement). Since 1945 its official seat is in Bückeburg

Despite the loss of the majority of its assets, the foundation still exists today and is administered by the descendants of the founder. It regularly publishes the so-called 'Silberne Buch der Familie Sack' (Silver Book) which records the history of the foundation and the family genealogy with the records of some 17,500 descendants

The foundation is particularly important because, due to the vast amount of wealth involved, it attracted the interest of the King of Prussia who wanted to appropriate its funds for the war effort against Napoleon. The initial assets were some 247,747 Thaler and the Count of Hoym who administered royal affairs in Silesia had a mathematician calculate that, as the number of initial beneficiaries was so small, the interest would accrue to the extent that in a few decades the assets would exceed those of the State of Prussia. A long process of negotiation with the King concluded with half the assets being kept for beneficiaries and the remainder was used to build the first state 'Werksschulen' in Silesia, thus paving the way for state education. This event was referred to as the Embarras de richesses (embarrassment of riches).

== The Foundation Today ==
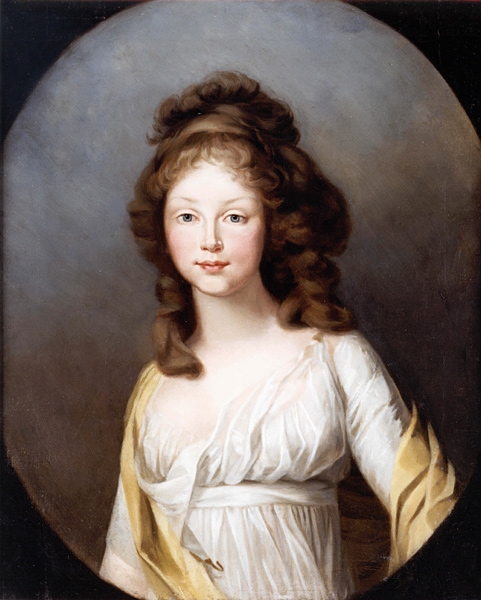
Johann Heinrich Wilhelm Tischbein (attr. to), Portrait of Queen Louise of Prussia, painted after 1796

The archives of the foundation are stored and partially displayed at the Prussian Museum in North Rhine Westphalia in Germany. The most famous artifact is the painting by Johann Heinrich Wilhelm Tischbein: Louise of Mecklenburg-Strelitz (1776–1810), since 1793 wife of Frederick William III of Prussia. (1770–1840.

The Family magazine 'Die Taube' (The Dove) which has been almost continually published twice per annum since 1886 is still published today in both German and English. The latest edition of the 'Silver Book' was published in 2010 and included the data on over 17,500 descendants and was of some 566 pages, 310 x 230 mm.
