= Johannes Vorst =

1623-1696

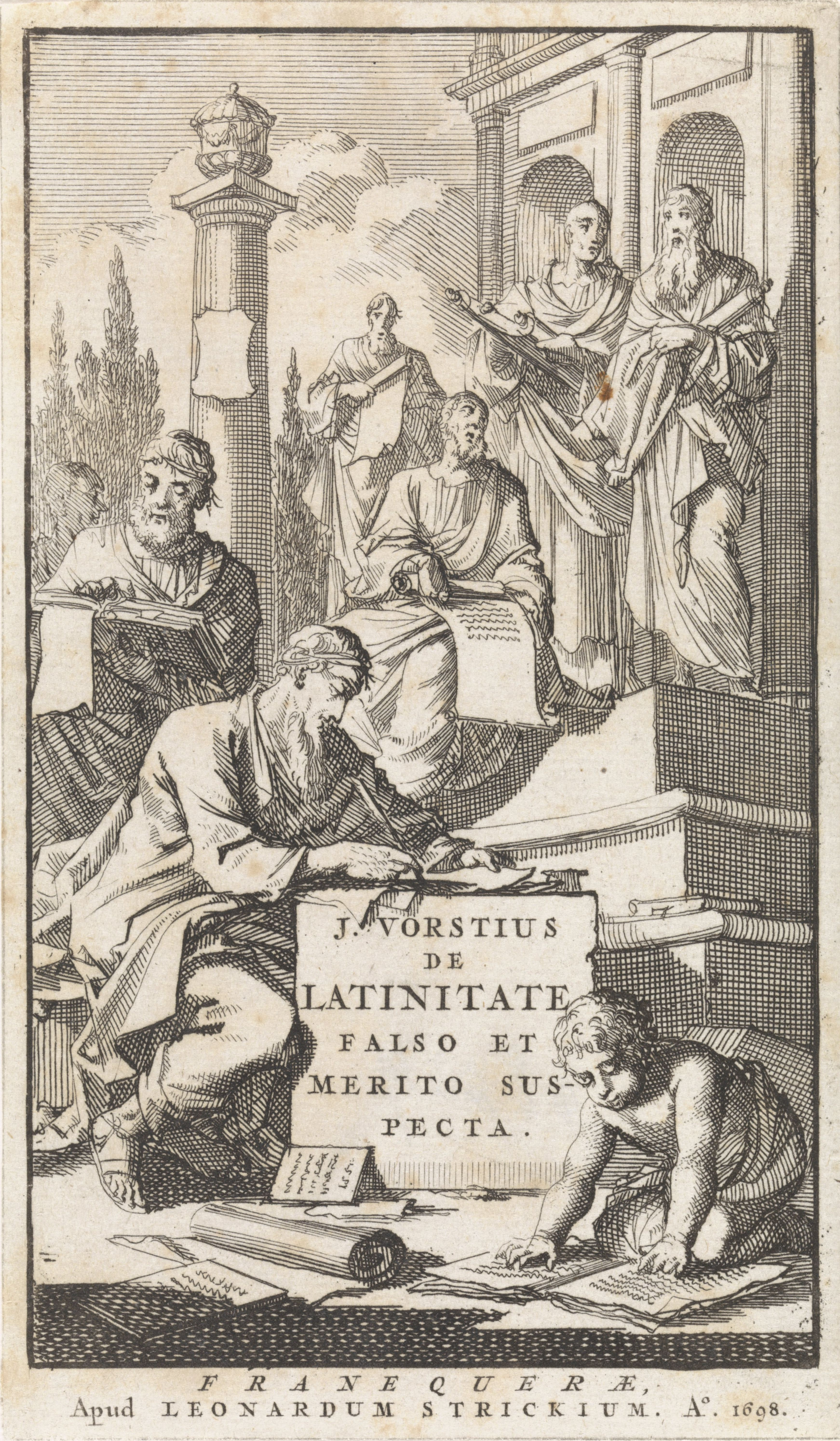
- Johannes Vorst, De latinitate merito suspecta, 1698
- Born: 1623; Wieselburg
- Died: 4 August 1676 (aged 52–53); Berlin
- Alma mater: University of Wittenberg; University of Rostock
- Occupation: Theologian, librarian
- Position held: rector

Johannes Vorst (1623 – 4 August 1676) was a Protestant theologian of Germany.

== Biography ==
Johannes Vorst was born in Wieselburg in 1623. He studied, at Wittenberg, and was appointed in 1653 rector at Flensburg. In 1655 the Rostock University made him a licentiate of theology, and shortly afterwards he was called to Berlin as rector of the Joachimsthal Gymnasium. In 1660 he resigned his position, and became librarian to the elector of Brandenburg. He died on 4 August 1676.

== Works ==
- Dissertatio de Lingua Omnium Prima (Flensburg, 1675);
- Syntagma Miscellaneorum Academicorum (Rostock, 1652);
- De Hebraismis Novi Testamenti Comment. (Leyden, 1665);
- De Notabili Correctionum Masoreticarum Genere (ibid. 1678);
- Diatribe de Adagis N. T. (Berlin, 1669), etc.

== Bibliography ==
- This article incorporates public domain material from McClintock, John; Strong, James (1867–1887). Cyclopædia of Biblical, Theological and Ecclesiastical Literature. Harper and Brothers. Cites:
  - Möller, Cimbria Literata;
  - Winer, Handb. der theol. Lit. 1, 30, 125, 129, 912;
  - Jocher, Allgemeines Gelehrten-Lex. s.v.;
  - Furst, Bibl. Jud. 3, 487;
  - Steinschneider, Bibl. Handb. s.v.
