= Philipp Karl Buttmann =

German philologist (1764–1829)

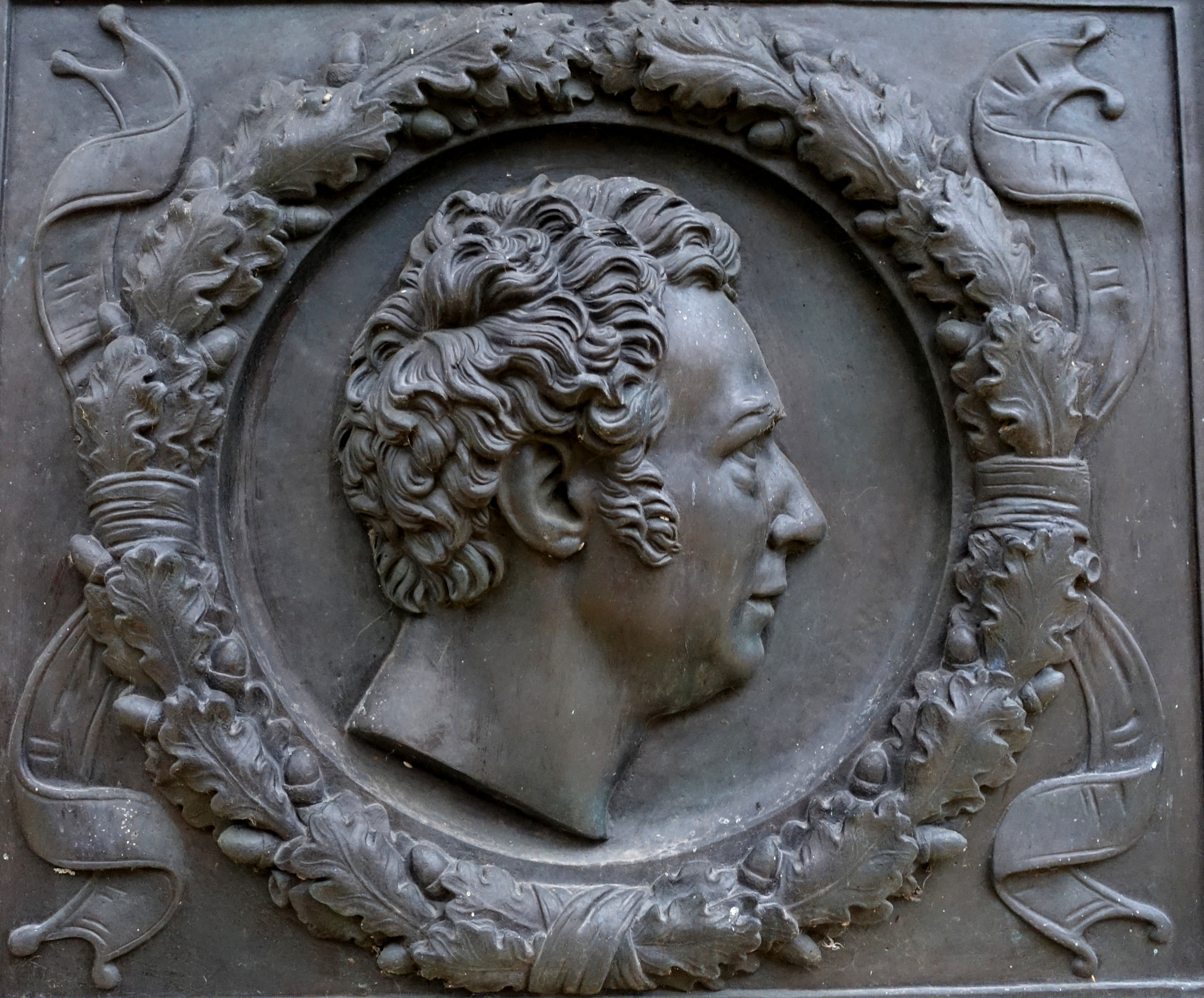
Philipp Karl Buttmann

Philipp Karl Buttmann (5 December 1764 – 21 June 1829) was a German philologist of French Huguenot ancestry (original family name "Boudemont"), born in Frankfurt am Main.

He was educated in his native town and at the University of Göttingen, where he was a student of Christian Gottlob Heyne. In 1789 he obtained an appointment in the Royal Library of Berlin, and for a period of time, edited Spener's Journal. In 1800 he became a professor at the Joachimsthal Gymnasium in Berlin, a post he held for eight years. In 1806 he was admitted to the Academy of Sciences as a member of its historical-philological section. In 1811 he became first librarian at the Royal Library.

== Published works ==
Buttmann's writings gave a great impetus to the scientific study of the Greek language. His Griechische Grammatik (1792) went through many editions, and was translated into English. His Lexilogus, a valuable study on some words of difficulty occurring principally in the poems of Homer and Hesiod, was published in 1818–1825, and was later translated into English and published as Lexilogus: or, a critical examination of the meaning and etymology of numerous Greek works and passages intended principally for Homer and Hesiod (1861).

Buttmann's other works were:

- Ausfuhrliche griechische Sprachlehre (2 vols, 1819–1827).
- Mythologus, a collection of essays (1828–1829).
- editions of some classical authors, the most important being Demosthenes' In Midiam (1823).
- the continuation of Spalding's edition of Quintilian.
