= Joachimsthal Gymnasium =

Joachimsthalsches Gymnasium
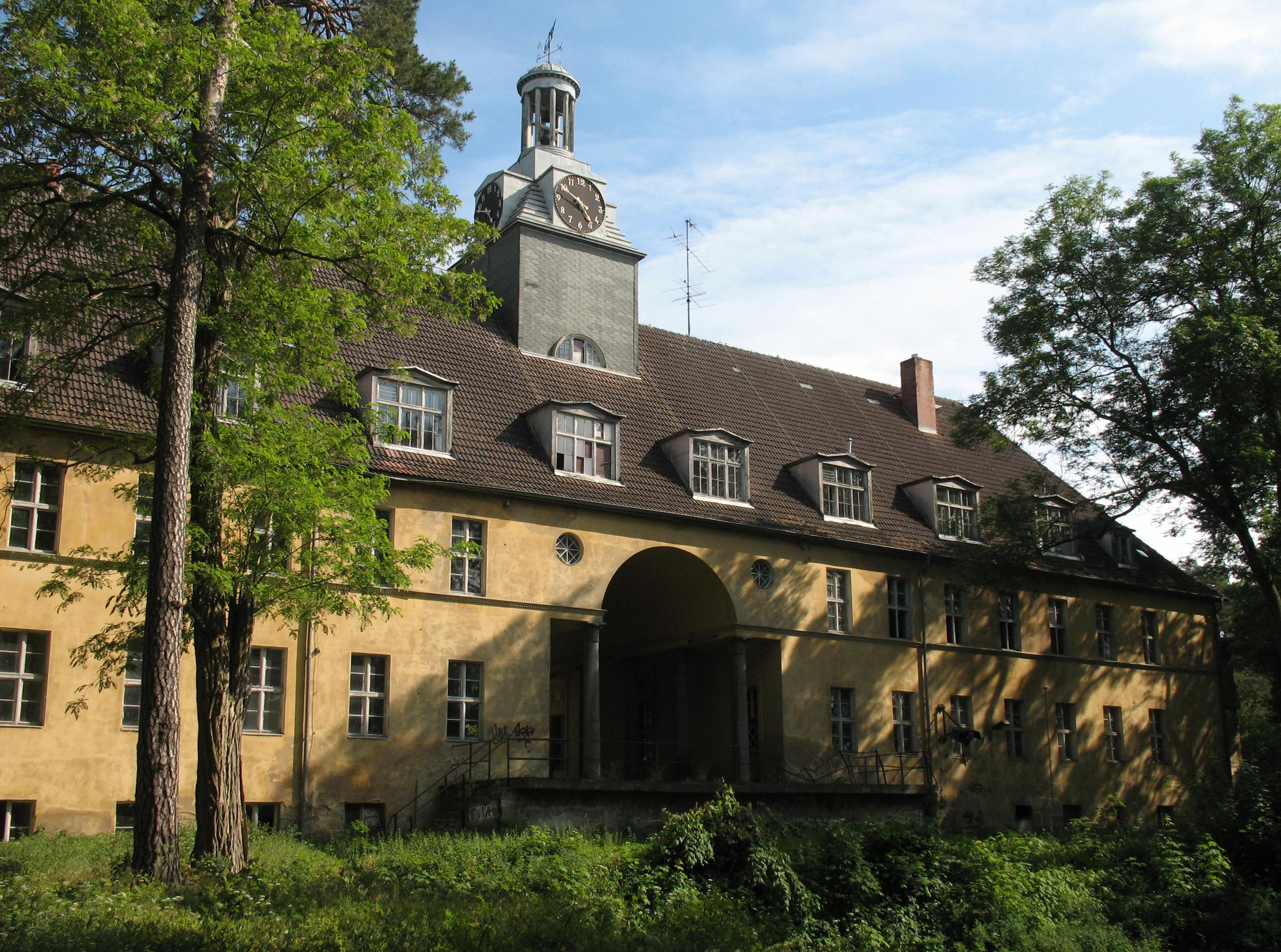
- Joachimsthalsches Gymnasium in Templin in 2012

Location
- Brunoldstraße 16a, Templin; Brandenburg; Germany; 52°29′55″N 13°19′48″E

The Joachimsthal Gymnasium (German: Joachimsthalsches or Joachimsthaler Gymnasium) was a princely high school (German: Fürstenschule) for gifted boys, founded in 1607 in Joachimsthal, Brandenburg. In 1636, during the Thirty Years' War, the school’s buildings were destroyed, and the school migrated to Berlin. In 1912 it moved again, to Templin, where it was a boarding school.

== Closure and re-founding ==
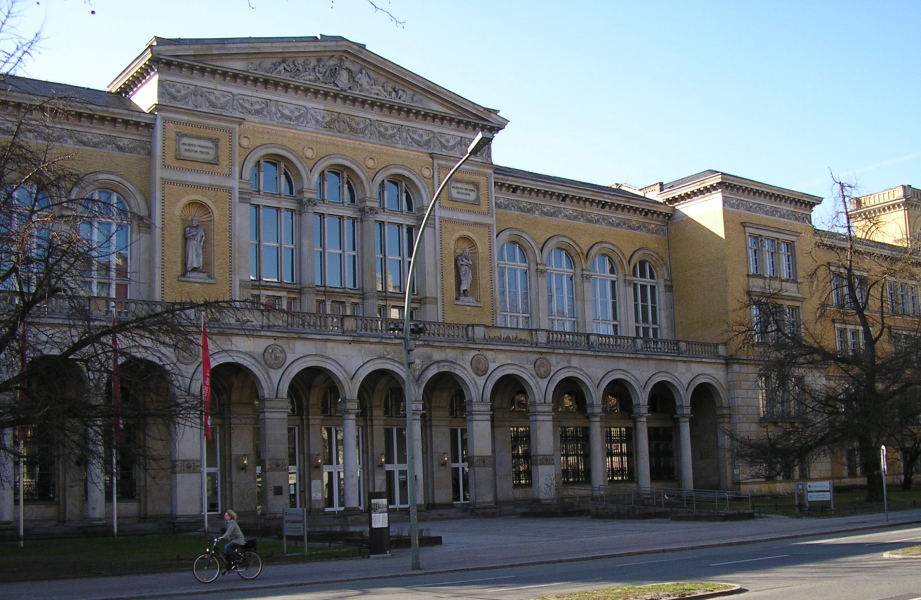
Former building of the Joachimsthal Gymnasium in Berlin

The school in Templin was closed in 1956, while the area was part of East Germany, and its buildings were used for other purposes until 1996. After that, they were left empty and fell into danger of decay.

In 2005, a new private school was refounded in Joachimsthal which took the name of the former school.

In 2013, the initiative Joachimsthalsches Gymnasium Templin was created, with the aim of converting the traditional school buildings at Templin into a new internationally oriented boarding school. On 6 December 2018, the Board of Governors of the European Schools, an NGO which has representatives of the Education Ministers of the EU Member States, decided to begin the accreditation process for a "European School Templin" (EST). Work on the renovation of the buildings is now under way, and the opening of the new school is planned for 2023.

== Notable Rectors ==
- 1655–1660: Johannes Vorst
- 1816–1826: Bernhard Moritz Snethlage
- 1826–1856: August Meineke

== Former pupils ==
- Johann Reinhold Forster (1729–1798), Calvinist pastor.
- Friedrich von Gentz (1764–1832), diplomat and writer.
- Johann Ernst Plamann (1771–1834), schoolmaster.
- Friedrich Ludwig Georg von Raumer (1781–1873), historian.
- Achim von Arnim (1781–1831), poet and novelist.
- Alfred von Schlieffen (–1853), Prussian general
- Gottfried Bernhardy (1800–1875), philologist and literary historian.
- Wilhelm Paul Corssen (1820–1875), philologist.

== Notable teaching staff ==
- Karl Gottlob Zumpt (1792–1849)
- Karl Wilhelm Krüger (1796–1874)
- Roger Wilmans (1812–1881)
- Rudolf Köpke (1813–1870)
- Philipp Karl Buttmann (1764–1829), taught at the school 1800–1808.
