= Sibylle Kemmler-Sack =

German chemist

Sibylle Kemmler-Sack (18 November 1934 in Leipzig – 10 February 1999) was a German chemist. She was a professor for Chemistry at the University of Tübingen.

== Life ==
Kemmler-Sack did her doctorate on "Untersuchungen an ternären Uran (V)oxiden" (Investigations on ternary uranium (V)oxides) in 1962. She habilitated in 1968 and the title of her habilitation thesis was "Über spektroskopische und magnetische Untersuchungen an Oxidfluoriden es fünfwertien Urans" (About spectroscopic and magnetic investigations on oxide fluorides it five-valent uranium). She became a university lecturer in 1968, an extraordinary professor in 1973, a university professor in 1978.

== Research ==
One focus of her work was the synthesis and characterization of perovskite phases. She investigated their luminescence and their conductivity in a systematic manner. In the 1990s, she also synthesized bismuth and bismuth/lead superconducting cuprates and investigated how the conductivity changed when Cu^{2+} is gradually replaced by other transition metal ions.
