= Simon Heinrich Sack =

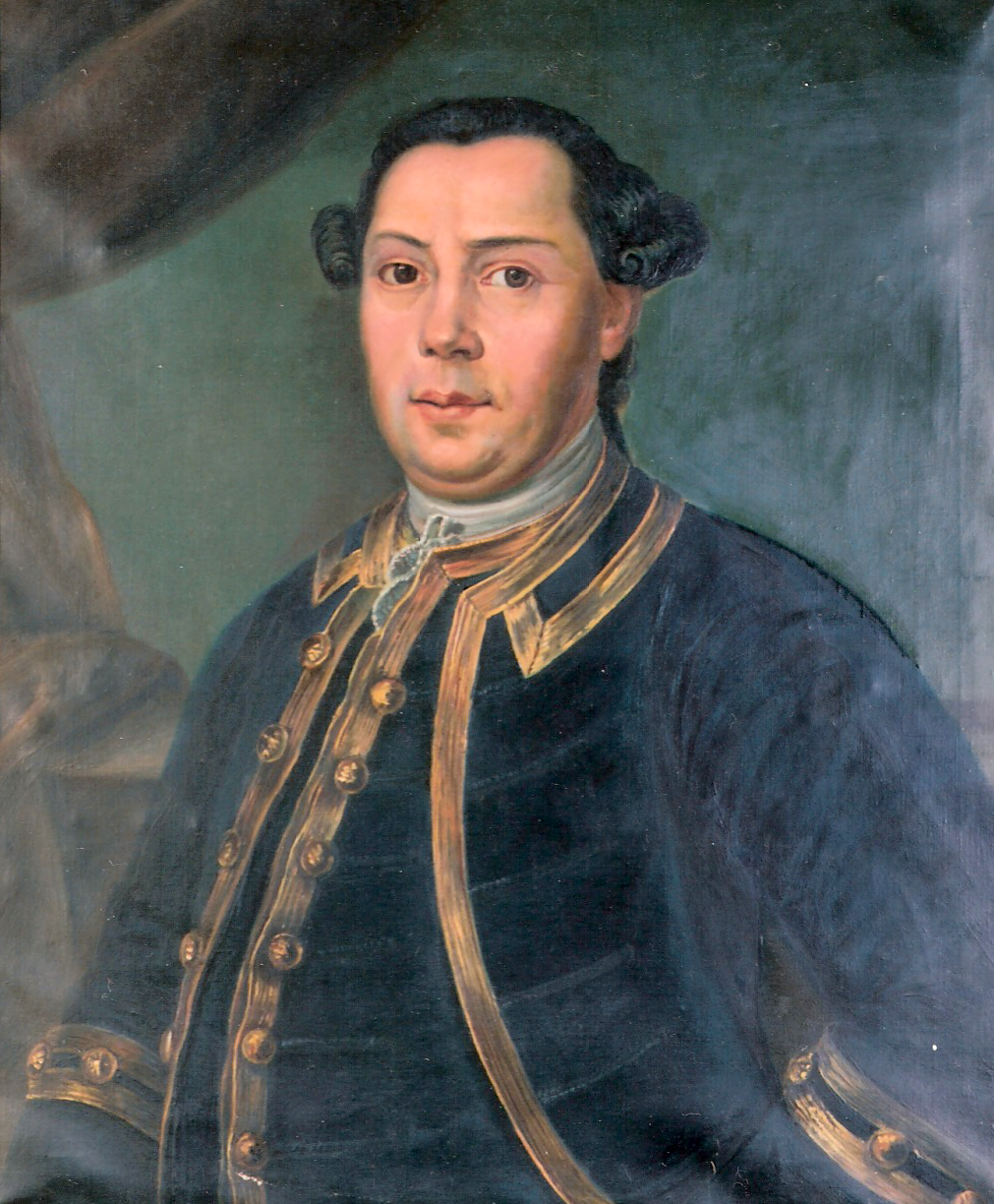
Portrait of Sack in later years

Simon Heinrich Sack (27 June 1723 in Hecklingen – 2 December 1791 in Glogau) was Hofrat (Privy Councilor), Justice Commissioner and adviser to King Frederick II of Prussia. He accumulated considerable wealth in this capacity with which he founded the Privy Councillor Simon Heinrich Sack Family Foundation in Prussia and which still exists to this day.

== Early life ==
Simon Heinrich Sack was named after his maternal grandfather Simon Heinrich Lucanus, a government lawyer in Halberstadt. He received his education from his father who was also a teacher and later attended Gymnasium at Bernberg and Zerbst.

== Career ==
Portrait of Sack

After studying law at the University of Frankfurt an der Oder, he was employed by the District Authority of Glogau as barrister at the age of 19. At the age of 22, in 1745, the young barrister was admitted to the Bar and five years later, in 1750, was appointed to The Privy and Criminal Council. Already, at the age of 25, he is to be seen represented in the great oil portrait with the family crest, 'The Alighting Dove'.

With the difficult changes in property ownership after the first Silesian Wars (1740/42 and 1744/45) and particularly after the 7-Years War (1756-1763), the by-then well known advocate, who earned his favour with clients as reputable and capable, was constantly in demand. He enjoyed a high reputation with the Silesian aristocracy who viewed him as a patriotic and impartial lawyer.

== Family and testament ==
He was the son of the Hecklingen preacher Friedrich Ernst Sack and had 5 brothers. As his brother Friedrich Leberich Sack died in 1773, he took over responsibility for his three children. He had no children of his own apart from an illegitimate daughter so he left most of his money to his brothers' descendants in a foundation. Some 66,500 Taler were distributed amongst some immediate relatives and the attorneys received 15,000 Taler. This still left the vast sum of 247,747 Taler for the foundation. This became a subject of much dispute because the Graf of Hoym had calculated that should the money continue to gain interest the funds would reach 1,083,168,426 Taler after 200 years and would thus be more than the whole of the capital of the State of Prussia. This issue was nicknamed "Embarras de richesses". The Sack family has connections to the most important families in Prussia and is related to the Sethe family, Haeckel, Lindner, v.Beguelin, Dewitz, v. Frankenberg, v. Flotow, v. Obernitz, v. Pionski, v. Rabenau and v. Richthoven.

Kaiser Wilhelm I was presented with the "Silberne Buch“ of the Sack Family on his 90th birthday in remembrance of the "Höchstdero Taufe und Confirmation" by the court preacher and first Prussian bishop Friedrich Samuel Gottfried Sack. The foundation which Simon Heinrich Sack established still exists today and has over 17,000 listed members in it so-called 'Silver Book'. Many records and works of art relating to Simon Heinrich Sack and his descendants are to be found with the Prussian Museum in Wesel and Minden, Germany, including the famous painting of Luise von Mecklenburg-Strelitz (1776-1810), wife of Friedrich Wilhelm III.

== See also ==
- Privy Councillor Simon Heinrich Sack Family Foundation
