= Theodor Friedrich Stange =

Theodor Friedrich Stange (1 November 1742, Osternienburg – 10 June 1831, Halle an der Saale) was a German Protestant theologian and educator.

He served as rector at the Reformed gymnasiums in Düsseldorf (from 1770) and Köthen, and in 1781 was named director of the gymnasium in Hamm. In 1789 he was appointed professor of church history at the Reformed gymnasium in Halle. In 1804 he became an associate professor at the University of Halle, where in 1828 he attained a full professorship.

== Works ==
Stange is largely known for his studies involving Old Testament exegesis. From 1802 to 1805, he issued his main work, "Theologische Symmika", in three volumes. In the field of classical philology, he published an edition of the ancient Greek lyrical poet Alcaeus, titled "Alcaei poetae lyrici fragmenta" (1810). A few of his other noteworthy writings are the following:

- "Particula Altera et Ultima", 1779.
- "Anti-critica in locos quosdam Psalmorum a criticis sollicitatos", 1791.
- "De antiquitate religionis revelatae", 1797.
- "Beiträge zur hebräischen Grammatik", 1820 (Contributions to Hebrew grammar).
