= Karl Heinrich Sack =

German theologian (1789–1875)

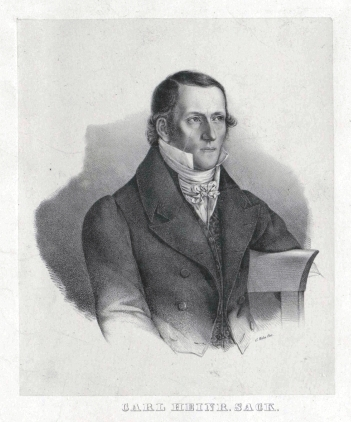
Karl Heinrich Sack

Karl Heinrich Sack (1789–1875) was a German Protestant theologian and university professor.

== Life ==
Karl Heinrich Sack, son of Friedrich Samuel Gottfried Sack, was born at Berlin on 17 October 1789. He studied at Gottingen and Berlin, and commenced his lectures at the Berlin University in 1817. In 1818 he was made professor extraordinary, and in 1832 professor of theology in Bonn.

He died at Pappelsdorf, near Bonn, on 16 October 1875.

== Works ==
Of his many works may be mentioned:

- Christliche Apologetik (Hamburg, 1841)
- Christliche Polemik (Hamburg, 1838)
- Geschichte der Predigt von Mosheim bis Schleiermacher und Menken (Heidelberg, 1866)
- Theologische Aufsatze (Gotha, 1871)

== Sources ==
- Erdmann, David (1890). "Sack, Karl Heinrich". In Allgemeine Deutsche Biographie. Vol. 30. Leipzig: Duncker & Humblot. pp. 153–161.

Attribution:

- Lacroix, J. P. (1880). "Sack, Carl Heinrich, Dr". "Sack, Friedrich Ferdinand Adolph". "Sack, Friedrich Samuel Gottfried". In McClintock, John; Strong, James (eds.). Cyclopædia of Biblical, Theological and Ecclesiastical Literature. Vol. 9.—Rh–St. New York: Harper & Brothers. pp. 210–211.
