= Matthias von Schoenberg =

German Catholic author

Matthias von Schoenberg (9 November 1732 – 20 April 1792 in Munich) was a Catholic author. In 1750, He joined the Society of Jesus. He was in charge of Eleemosyna Aurea from 1766 to 1772.
