= Bernhard Moritz Snethlage =

Bernhard Moritz Snethlage (28 May 1753, Tecklenburg – 19 November 1840, Berlin) was a German educator. He was the father of clergyman Karl Wilhelm Moritz Snethlage (1792–1871).

He studied theology, philosophy and other subjects at Duisburg and Utrecht, and for a period of time, worked as a private tutor in Arnhem and Amsterdam. In 1779 he became a teacher of mathematics at the gymnasium in Hamm, where he subsequently attained the title of rector (1781). In 1789 he succeeded Theodor Friedrich Stange as director of the Hamm gymnasium. From 1802 to 1826, he was director of the Joachimsthal Gymnasium in Berlin. In 1816 he was appointed Konsistorialrat. In 1826 he was succeeded at Joachimsthal by classical philologist August Meineke.

== Selected works ==
- "Frankreichs Revolution ist warnend und lehrreich für alle Nationen : Eine politisch-pädagogische Abhandlung", (1794) – The French Revolution is a warning for all nations: a political and educational treatise.
- "Ueber den gegenwärtigen Zustand der niedern Schulen und ihre zweckmäßigere Einrichtung", (1798).
- "Bemerkungen über Pestalozzi's Lehrmethode", (1804) – Comments regarding the Pestalozzian teaching method.
- "Über einige Hindernisse welche den Erfolg der Erziehung und die vermehrte Wohlfarth der Staaten aufhalten", (1805) – On some obstacles that stop the success of education, etc.
- "Kurze Uebersicht der Geschichte des Königl. Joachimsthalschen Gymnasiums", (1824) – Overview on the history of the Joachimsthal Gymnasium.
