= Wilhelm Ihne =

German historian (1821–1902)

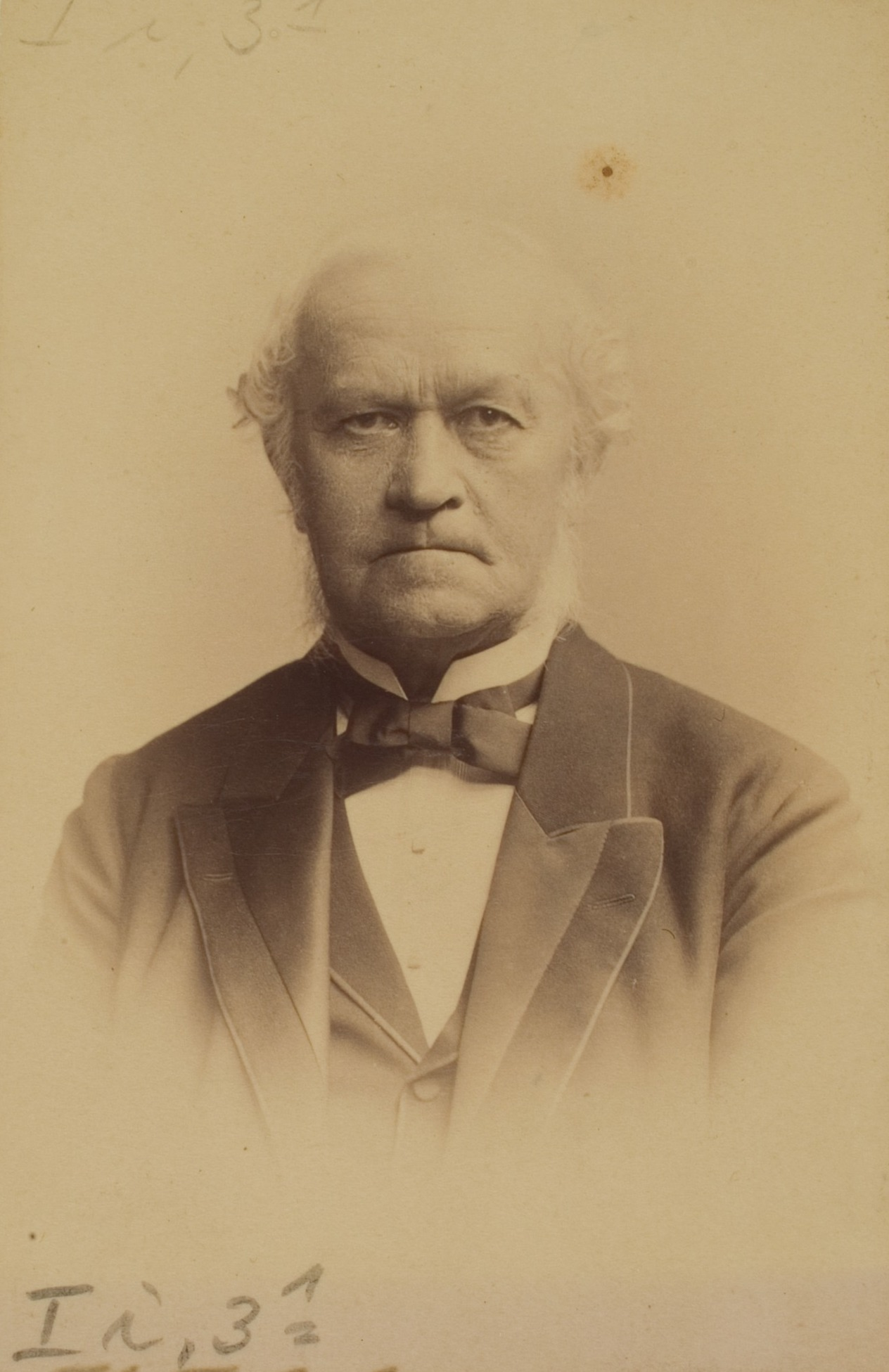
Wilhelm Ihne

Joseph Anton Friedrich Wilhelm Ihne (2 February 1821 – 21 March 1902) was a German historian who was a native of Fürth. He was the father of architect Ernst von Ihne (1848–1917).

== Life ==
He studied philology at Bonn, obtaining his degree in 1843 with a thesis titled Quaestiones Terentianae. From 1847 to 1849 he was a teacher in Elberfeld, afterwards moving to England, where he taught school in Liverpool until 1863. He returned to Germany as a lecturer at the University of Heidelberg, where in 1873 he was appointed professor. He died in Heidelberg.

== Works ==
Ihne is remembered for the classic Römische Geschichte (History of Rome), a work published in eight volumes from 1868 to 1890, and also translated into English. Other works on Roman history by Ihne include:

- Forschungen auf dem Gebiet der rom Verfassungsgeschichte, 1847; later published in English as: Researches into the History of the Roman Constitution, (1853).
- Early Rome : from the Foundation of the City to its Destruction by the Gauls (in English, 1875).
- Zur Ehrenrettung des Kaisers Tiberius ("A plea of the Emperor Tiberius"), 1892.

== Bibliography ==
- translated Biography @ Meyers Konversations-Lexikon
- History of Rome (at Google Books)
- Author:Wilhelm Ihne – via Wikisource.
- Researches into the History of the Roman Constitution in English translation and with an Appendix upon the Roman Knights (1853)
- History of Rome in English (at Internet Archive): five volumes from 1871 onwards: Volume 1 from Aeneas to the Conquest of Italy; Volume 2 covering the Punic Wars; Volume 3 covering from 200 BC to 133 BC; Volume 4 covering Roman institutions and the Gracchi; Volume 5 from the Jugurthine War to Sulla.
- Römische Geschichte in German (also at Internet Archive): remaining three volumes of Roman History covering roughly the period from Sulla's death to the dominance of Octavian / Augustus following the Battle of Actium in 31 BC: Volume 6 and Volumes 7 and 8 combined
- Early Rome : from the Foundation of the City to its Destruction by the Gauls in English translation (1898)
