= Karl Gottlob Zumpt =

German classical philologist (1792–1849)

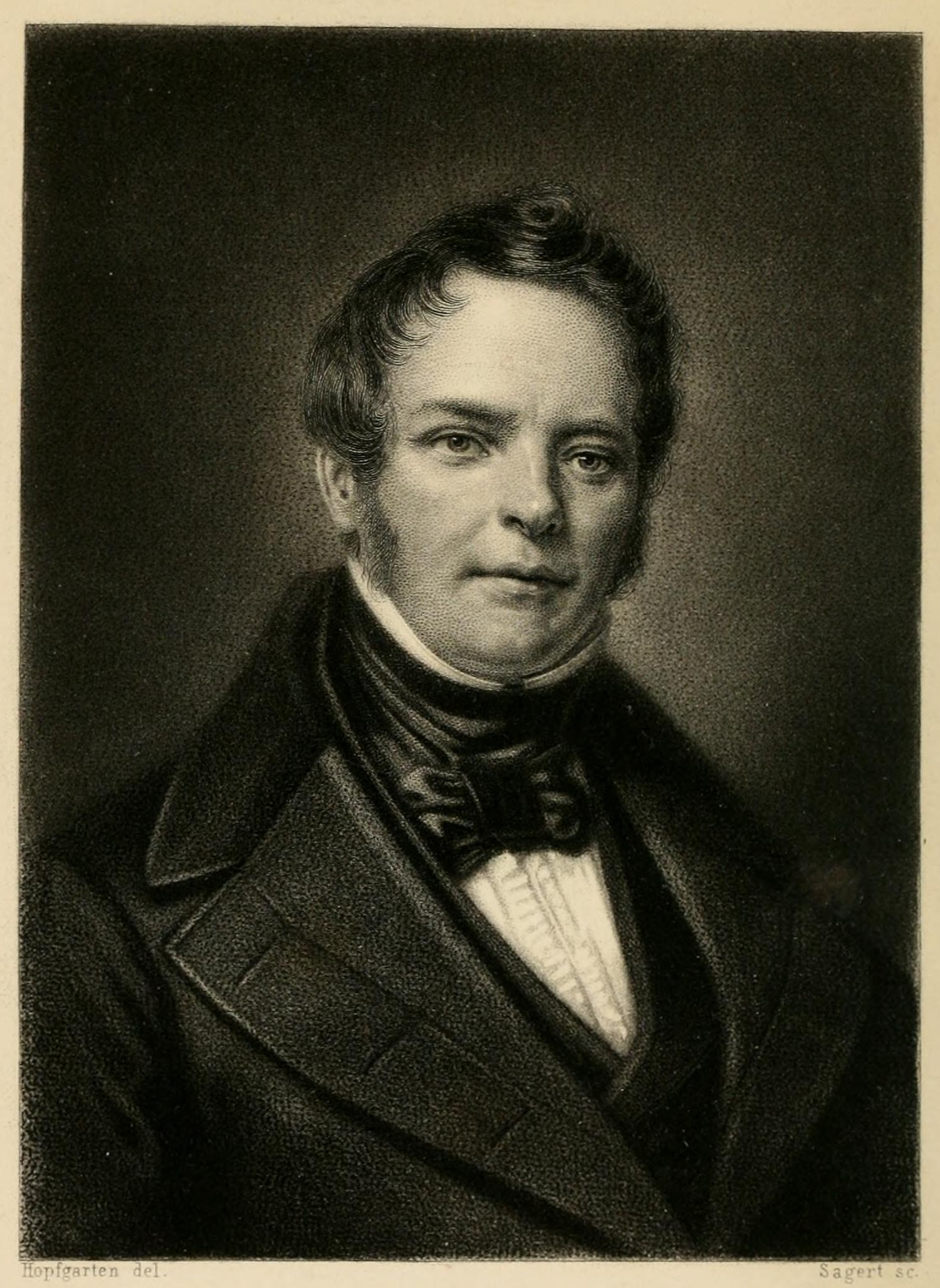
Karl Gottlob Zumpt

Karl or Carl Gottlob Zumpt (Latin: Carolus Timotheus Zumpt; 20 March 1792 – 26 June 1849) was a German classical scholar known for his work in the field of Latin philology.

== Life ==
Karl Gottlob Zumpt was born at Berlin on 20 March 1792.

Educated at Heidelberg and Berlin, he was from 1812 onward, a schoolteacher at Friedrich Werder Gymnasium in Berlin. In 1821 he transferred as a professor to the Joachimsthal Gymnasium, also in Berlin. In 1827 he was appointed professor of classical philology at the University of Berlin.

His chief work was his "Latin Grammar" ("Lateinische Grammatik"", 1818), which stood as a standard work until superseded by Johan Nicolai Madvig's textbook in 1844 (In Danish: "Latinsk Sproglære til Skolebrug"). He edited Quintilian's "Institutio Oratoria" (Volume 5, 1829, a project started by Georg Ludwig Spalding), as well as works by Quintus Curtius Rufus and Cicero:

- "Q. Curtii Rufi De gestis Alexandri Magni, regis Macedonum, libri qui supersunt octo by Quintus Curtius Rufus", 1826.
- "M. Tullii Ciceronis Verrinarum libri septem", 1830.
- "M. Tullii Ciceronis de officiis libri tres. Ad optimorum exemplarium sidem recensiti", 1837.

Otherwise, he primarily devoted his time and efforts to Roman history, publishing "Annales veterum regnorum et populorum" (3rd edition 1862), a work in chronology down to 476 AD, and other antiquarian studies.

He was the uncle of August Wilhelm Zumpt.
