= August Friedrich Wilhelm Sack =

German theologian (1703–1786)

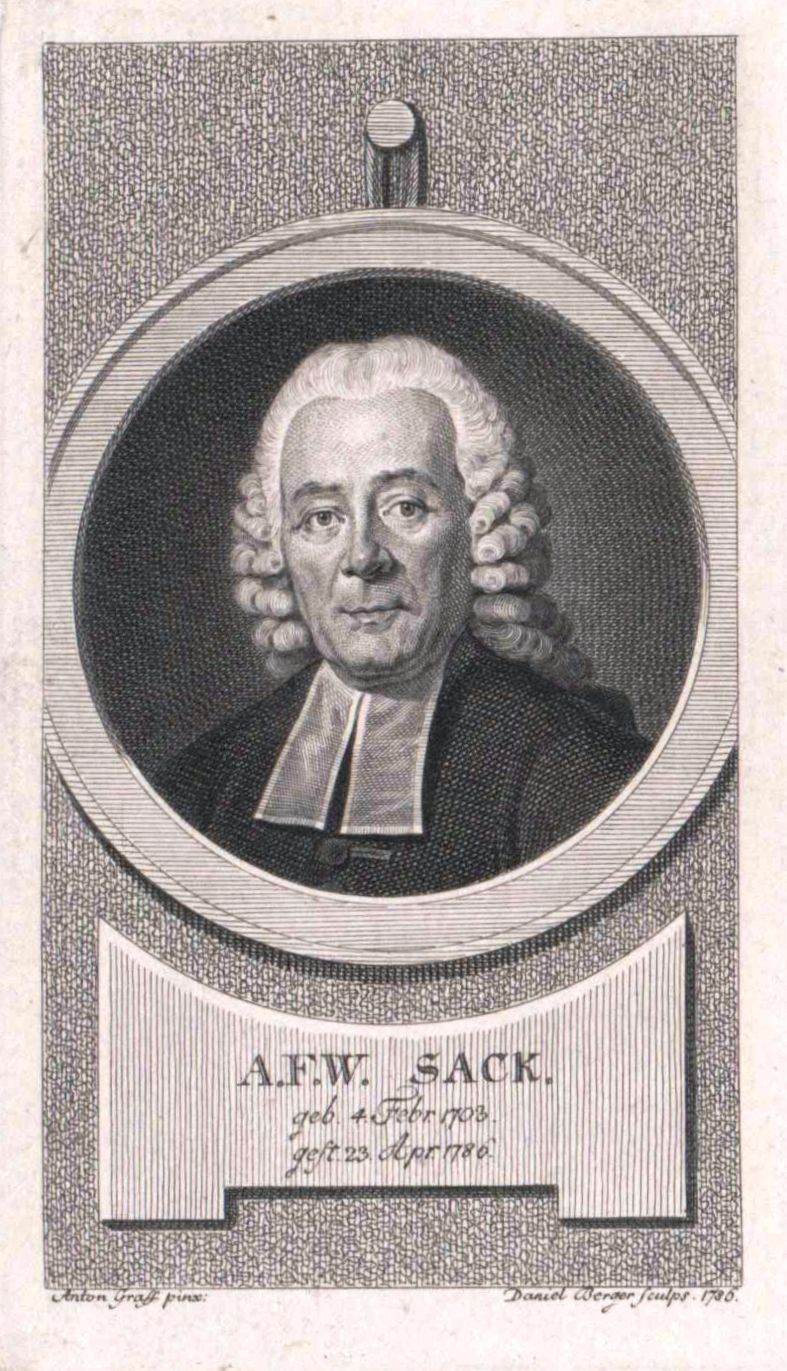
Portrait engraved by Daniel Berger after a painting by Anton Graff, 1786

August Friedrich Wilhelm Sack (1703–1786) was one of the most eminent German Reformed preachers and a prominent liberal theologian of the reign of Frederick II of Prussia who helped shape the Enlightenment in Berlin and Prussia.

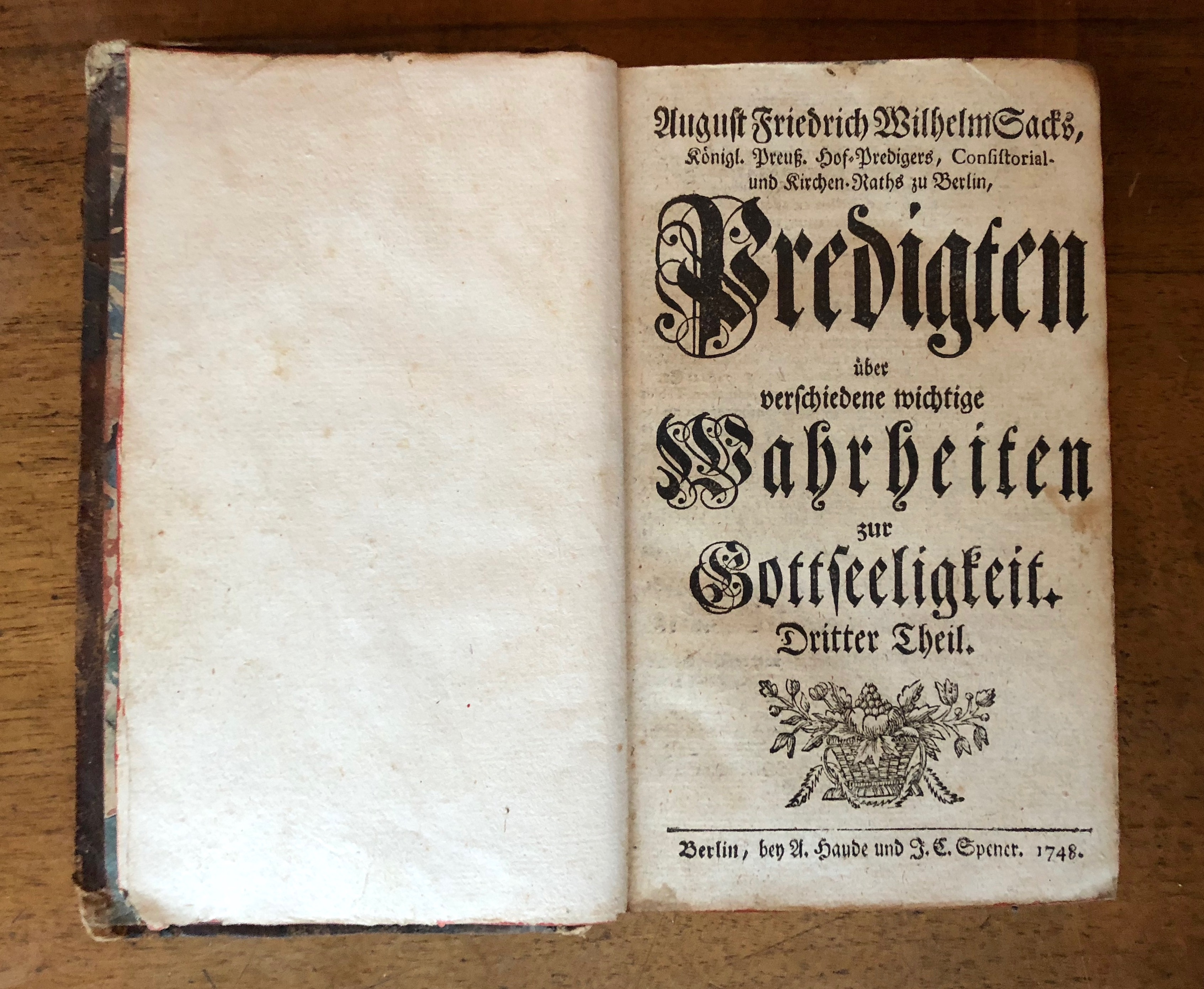
10 Predigten über verschiedene wichtige Wahrheiten zur Gottseeligkeit, Dritter Theil, 1748

== Life ==
August Friedrich Wilhelm Sack was born at Harzgerode in the Principality of Anhalt-Harzgerode on 4 February 1703, the eldest son of the mayor of the town. In 1722–1724 he studied at Frankfort-on-the-Oder. The next two years he passed as tutor in the family of a French preacher at Stettin. Then he studied in Holland. Here he became acquainted with the chief theologians of Arminianism, from which his own views took a permanent colouring. From 1728 to 1731 he was teacher to a young prince in the neighbourhood of Magdeburg. In 1731 he began to preach in Magdeburg, and rapidly rose in esteem and in office.

In the last year of the old king Frederick William I (1740) he was called to Berlin, where he entered upon his ministry of forty years. It was a successful career. He stood independent between the two prevalent parties—the orthodox and the rationalists—holding to what he saw as the good in both parties, and was esteemed by many in both camps. At the outbreak of the Seven Years' War he accompanied the royal family to Magdeburg, and there, for three years, was charged with the education of the crown prince. At the close of the war, he resumed his labours as cathedral preacher in Berlin. He preached his last sermon in 1780. He died on 3 April 1786.

The main source for knowledge of his life is a biography together with some letters and other writings which were published by his son, Friedrich Samuel Gottfried Sack: Lebensbeschreibung nebst einigen von ihm hinterlassenen Briefen und Schriften (2 vols. Berlin, 1789).

== Works ==
The chief theological work of Sack is Der vertheidigte Glaube der Christen (issued first in 1751, again in 1773), a popular statement and defence of Christian doctrine. In this work, says John Powers Lacroix, the author ably and safely avoids the two fatal extremes of dynamic determinism as to the action of grace and of the self-regeneration of the Socinians. "The objective conditions of salvation are miraculously prepared in redemption; the subjective appropriation of these conditions is left to human freedom. God cannot convert man without man; man cannot convert himself without God."

Of Sack's sermons several volumes appeared (1735 to 1764). They passed through many editions. One volume of them was translated into French by Frederick II's queen, Elizabeth: Six Sermons de M. Sack (1775).

== Sources ==
- Dehrmann, Mark-Georg (2011). "Sack, August Friedrich Wilhelm". In Klemme, Heiner F., & Kuehn, Manfred (eds.). The Dictionary of Eighteenth-Century German Philosophers. Continuum. Retrieved 2 November 2022 – via Oxford Reference.
- Lommatzsch, Siegfried (1894). "Sack, Wilhelm". In Allgemeine Deutsche Biographie. Vol. 37. Leipzig: Duncker & Humblot. pp. 295–307.

Attribution:

- Lacroix, J. P. (1880). "Sack, August Friedrich Wilhelm". In McClintock, John; Strong, James (eds.). Cyclopædia of Biblical, Theological and Ecclesiastical Literature. Vol. 9.—Rh–St. New York: Harper & Brothers. p. 210.
