= Robert L. Sack =

American sleep researcher

Robert Leroy Sack (born March 14, 1942) is an American physician and researcher specializing in sleep medicine. He is certified by the American Board of Psychiatry and Neurology and the American Board of Sleep Disorders Medicine. On the faculty of the Oregon Health & Science University since 1977, he is the medical director of its Clinical Sleep Disorders Medicine Program which he developed parallel with his research on circadian rhythms.

For many years, Sack, together with Alfred J. Lewy, has conducted research on sleep, light therapy and melatonin. Their work resulted in a U.S. patent in 2002. Dr. Sack is, as of February 2010, listed as author of 71 PubMed articles, of which 17 are reviews. He has authored chapters in books, for example "Therapy of Circadian Sleep Disorders" in Sleep Medicine Essentials. His discovery of the power of the hormone melatonin to entrain people with circadian rhythm sleep disorders has benefited many people, both blind and sighted, earning him credit in a New England Journal of Medicine editorial. Sack is the author of the two-part American Academy of Sleep Medicine review on circadian rhythm sleep disorders. He was the brother of Bradley Sack of Johns Hopkins University.
