= Friedrich Samuel Gottfried Sack =

German theologian (1738–1817)

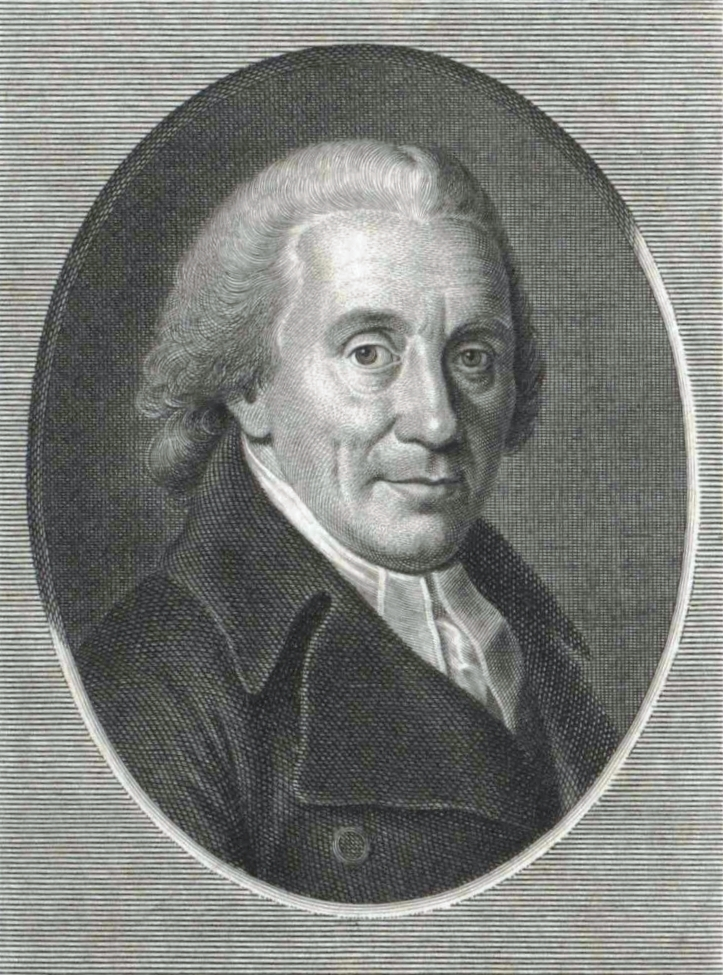
Friedrich Samuel Gottfried Sack, engraved by Johann Heinrich Lips

Friedrich Samuel Gottfried Sack (1738–1817) was a Prussian theologian, court preacher, and Church governor.

== Life ==
Friedrich Samuel Gottfried Sack was born in Magdeburg in the Prussian Duchy of Magdeburg on 4 September 1738, the eldest son of August Friedrich Wilhelm Sack by his second wife. His mother was descended of a French refugee family, which explains a fondness which Sack had for the French language and literature.

He studied at the University of Frankfort-on-the-Oder from 1755 to 1757. The next two years he studied in England, coming into contact with Secker, the Archbishop of Canterbury, Kennicott, Lardner, and others. On his return to Germany he acted as tutor to a young nobleman, whom he accompanied to Frankfort-on-the-Oder, and where he again heard lectures. He now associated much with Tollner.

After preaching at Magdeburg (1769–1777), he was called by Frederick II as fifth court preacher to Berlin. Gradually he rose to the first place. In 1786 he became a member of the high consistory. The years 1804–1813 were spent in arduous devotion to the oppressed and suffering people of the capital. In 1816 the King conferred upon him the title of bishop of the Evangelical Church. He died on 2 October 1817.

== Family ==
Friedrich Samuel Gottfried Sack was married Johanna Wilhelmine Spalding (1753–1832), daughter of Protestant theologian and philosopher Johann Joachim Spalding (1714–1804). His eldest son was Wilhelm Friedrich Sack (1772–1854), who was chief President of the Prussian Supreme Tribunal in Berlin. Sack's daughter Friederike Henriette Sack (1781–1852), married the Oberamts government councillor in Glogau Johann Wichardt Erbkam (1771–1838). Another daughter, Eleonore Philippine Amalie Sack (1783–1862), was married the later Minister of Culture Friedrich Eichhorn (1779–1856). His another son was Friedrich Ferdinand Adolph Sack (1788–1842), who also a court and cathedral preacher in Berlin. His youngest son was Carl Heinrich Sack (1789–1875), who was a Professor of Theology in Bonn. Among his descendants was theologian Wilhelm Heinrich Erbkam (1810–1884), Governor of Minden of the Prussian province of Westphalia Karl Friedrich Hermann Eichhorn (1813–1892) and Generalfeldmarschall Hermann von Eichhorn (1848–1918).

== Theology ==
In theology Sack was independent of the traditions of orthodoxy, but he stood firmly on evangelical ground. God as a person and Father; the Son as Redeemer and Offering; the Holy Spirit as comforter; love to God in Christ as the spring of the Christian life—such were the elements of his theology.

Though leaning somewhat towards rationalism, he yet firmly opposed the inroads which Kant's and Fichte's speculations made upon evangelical doctrine. He was one of the chief movers towards the union of the Lutheran and Reformed churches of Prussia, which was effected after his death.

For some years he stood in the closest relations to the young Schleiermacher, and rejoiced in a belief in the promise of good which the latter would bring to the Church. When this young divine first issued his celebrated Reden (1799), Sack openly expressed his paternal grief at what seemed to him a leaning towards pantheism in this work. In later editions many of the criticised passages were modified.

== Works ==
Sack was not productive; he was chiefly a practical worker. His published works consist of translations from English (Blair's Sermons) and Latin (Cicero's De Amicitia and De Senectute), two collections of Sermons, an Autobiography, and some minor Essays.

== Sources ==
- Lommatzsch, Siegfried (1894). "Sack, Gottfried". In Allgemeine Deutsche Biographie. Vol. 37. Leipzig: Duncker & Humblot. pp. 307–315.

Attribution:

- Lacroix, J. P. (1880). "Sack, Carl Heinrich, Dr". "Sack, Friedrich Ferdinand Adolph". "Sack, Friedrich Samuel Gottfried". In McClintock, John; Strong, James (eds.). Cyclopædia of Biblical, Theological and Ecclesiastical Literature. Vol. 9.—Rh–St. New York: Harper & Brothers. pp. 210–211.
