= Sox =

Sox most often refers to:

- Boston Red Sox, an MLB team
- Chicago White Sox, an MLB team
- Worcester Red Sox, an MiLB team
- An alternate spelling of socks

Sox or SOX may also refer to:

== Places ==
- SOX, Sogamoso Airport's IATA airport code, an airport in Colombia

== Computing and technology ==
- SOX (operating system), a UNIX clone developed in Brazil in the 1980s
- SoX or Sound eXchange, a computer program for audio manipulation
- Schema for Object-Oriented XML, an XML schema language
- Singapore Open Exchange, or SOX
- Simple Outline XML, an alternative XML syntax

== Finance and law ==
- PHLX Semiconductor Sector, a widely used stock market index
- Sarbanes–Oxley Act of 2002, a United States federal securities law

== Sports and related topics ==
- Black Sox Scandal, a 1919 baseball match fixing incident
- Bowie Baysox, a US minor league baseball team
- Bristol White Sox, a US minor league baseball team
- Butler BlueSox, playing in the Prospect League
- Colorado Springs Sky Sox, a US minor league baseball team
- Colorado Springs Sky Sox (Western League), a defunct American minor league baseball team
- Everett AquaSox, a US American minor league baseball team
- Holyoke Blue Sox, a college-level team playing in the NECBL
- Mesa Solar Sox, a U.S. winter league baseball team
- New Bedford Bay Sox, a college-level team playing in the NECBL
- Pawtucket Red Sox, a US minor league baseball team
- Salem Red Sox, a US minor league baseball team
- South Bend Blue Sox, a former girls' team 1943-1954
- Yarmouth–Dennis Red Sox, playing in the CCBL
- Sydney Blue Sox, an Australian professional baseball team

== Science ==
- Cancelled SOX experiment in neutrino physics, Borexino detector, Italy
- SOX gene family
- Several Sulfur oxides (SO_{x} or SOx)
- The Sox pathway in the microbial oxidation of sulfur

== Other uses ==
- Sox, a 1995 pop group led by Samantha Fox
- SOX, a type of low-pressure Sodium-vapor lamp
- Sox, robotic feline character from the 2022 American 3D-animated film Lightyear
- Sox, an Ethereal Monster in My Singing Monsters

== See also ==
- Socks (disambiguation)
- Black Sox (disambiguation)
- Blue Sox (disambiguation)
- Gold Sox (disambiguation)
- Green Sox (disambiguation)
- Grey Sox (disambiguation)
- Red Sox (disambiguation)
- Silver Sox (disambiguation)
- White Sox (disambiguation)
