= Redbirds–Sounds rivalry =

Minor League Baseball rivalry

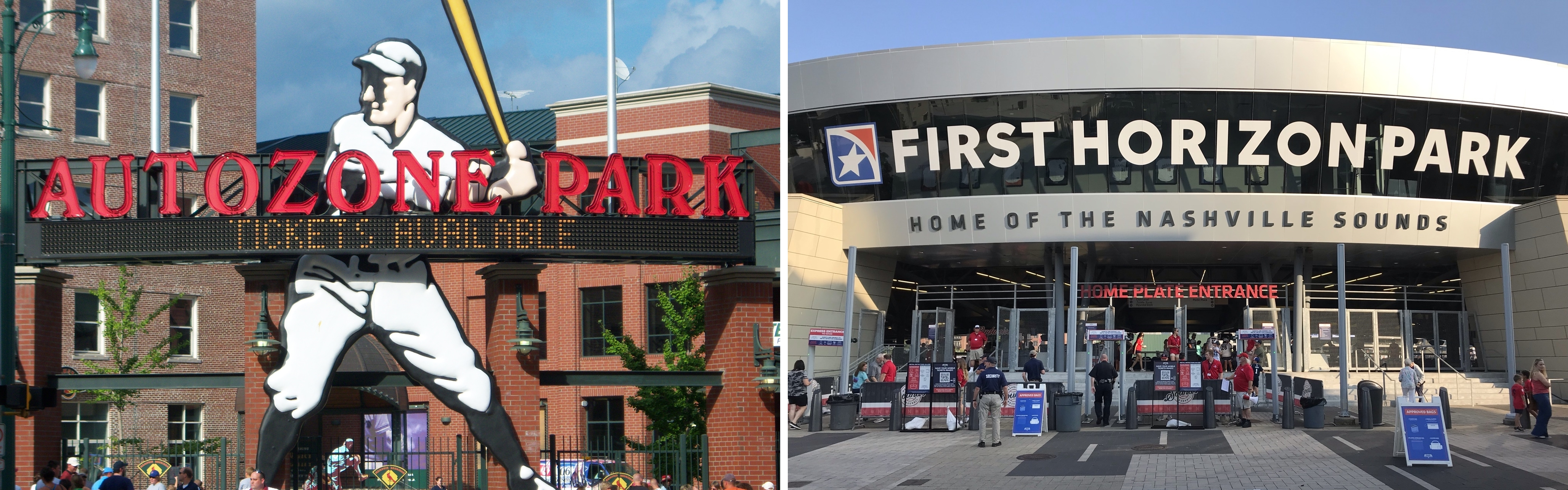
- AutoZone Park in Memphis and First Horizon Park in Nashville
- Sport: Baseball
- Teams: Memphis Redbirds; Nashville Sounds
- First meeting: May 17, 1998; Tim McCarver Stadium
- Latest meeting: Sep 15–20, 2026; First Horizon Park
- Next meeting: Apr 27 – May 2, 2027; First Horizon Park

Statistics
- Total meetings: 464
- Most wins: Sounds (250)
- Regular season series: 250–214, Sounds
- Largest victory: Redbirds: 18–1 (Jul 30, 2000); Sounds: 17–3 (Jun 20, 2026)
- Longest win streak: Sounds: 9 (Jul 4 – Aug 24, 2006); Redbirds: 6 (Aug 13 – Sep 1, 2005)
- Current win streak: Sounds: 1
- Ballpark locations in Tennessee

The Redbirds–Sounds rivalry is a Minor League Baseball rivalry between Tennessee's two Triple-A baseball teams, the Memphis Redbirds and the Nashville Sounds. The teams compete in the West Division of the International League. Their games are played at Memphis' AutoZone Park and Nashville's First Horizon Park. From 2012 to 2015, the rivalry was incorporated into a promotion called the I-40 Cup Series.

Separated by an approximately 200-mile (320 km) stretch of Interstate 40, competition between professional baseball teams from Memphis and Nashville began in 1885 in the original Southern League. The cities later fielded teams in the Southern Association and modern Southern League. The rivalry between the Redbirds and Sounds began in 1998 when both teams became members of the Pacific Coast League and continued in 2021 following placement in the Triple-A East, which became the International League in 2022.

Through the completion of the 2026 rivalry series, the Sounds lead the 29-year series versus the Redbirds with a win–loss record of 250–214 (.539). Since the first Redbirds–Sounds game played on May 17, 1998, the Sounds have led the all-time series for all but one day. A Memphis win on August 24, 2000, tied the record at an even 22 games apiece. Nashville won the next day's game and has not again relinquished the lead.

== History ==
=== Previous Memphis and Nashville teams ===
Memphis and Nashville have fielded several professional baseball teams which have competed in the same leagues since the late 19th century. The first meeting between Nashville and Memphis clubs occurred in 1885 when the Memphis Reds, their city's second professional team, played in the original Southern League along with the Nashville Americans, their city's first professional team. In 1886, the Americans faced competition in the Memphis Grays. For the 1887 season, the cities' Southern League entries were the Memphis Browns and Nashville Blues. The Nashville Tigers contended with the Memphis Fever Germs in 1893 and the Memphis Giants/Lambs in 1894. The dual-named Memphis club opposed the Nashville Seraphs in 1895. From 1901 to 1960, the Nashville Vols were members of the Southern Association with the Memphis Egyptians (1901–1908), Turtles (1909–1911), and Chickasaws (1912–1960).

Several Negro league teams from the two cities played in the Negro Southern League. The Memphis Red Sox and Nashville White Sox were members of the circuit from 1920 to 1922. In 1926 and from 1930 to 1932 and 1935 to 1936, the Red Sox faced off against the Nashville Elite Giants. The Nashville Cubs competed with the Memphis Blues in 1947 and the Red Sox in 1950.

The Nashville Sounds entered the cross-state rivalry in 1978 when they and the Memphis Chicks joined the Double-A Southern League as expansion teams playing in its Western Division. Sounds president Larry Schmittou and Chicks general manager Art Clarkson looked for every opportunity to provoke controversy between the clubs and their fans. The teams regularly figured in the championship playoffs from 1979 to 1981 with the Chicks winning the first half of each season and the Sounds winning the second halves, often finishing first and second ahead of the other. Nashville emerged as champions of the Western Division in 1979 and 1981, while Memphis won in 1980.

The 1981 season was particularly heated. Memphis won the first half by three-and-a-half games over second-place Nashville. At the Southern League All-Star Game, held just weeks later in Memphis, Sounds All-Stars Don Mattingly and Jamie Werly were greeted with boos during player introductions. With the Sounds winning the second half, the teams met in the Western Division series for the third consecutive year. In game one of the series in Memphis, a reversed call in the ninth inning in favor of Nashville resulted in a lengthy argument between Memphis coach Ray Crowley and the home plate umpire. Crowely was ejected and Chicks manager Larry Bearnarth played the rest of the game under protest. Memphis fans responded by throwing cups of ice and beer cans at Sounds players who had to be restrained from climbing over the dugout into the stands. The Sounds swept the Chicks, 3–0, to win the division title.

The rivalry was interrupted when the Sounds moved to the Triple-A American Association in 1985. Briefly, from 1993 to 1994, the Chicks competed against the Nashville Xpress, a displaced Southern League team who shared a ballpark with the Sounds.

=== Redbirds vs. Sounds ===
==== Pacific Coast League (1998–2020) ====
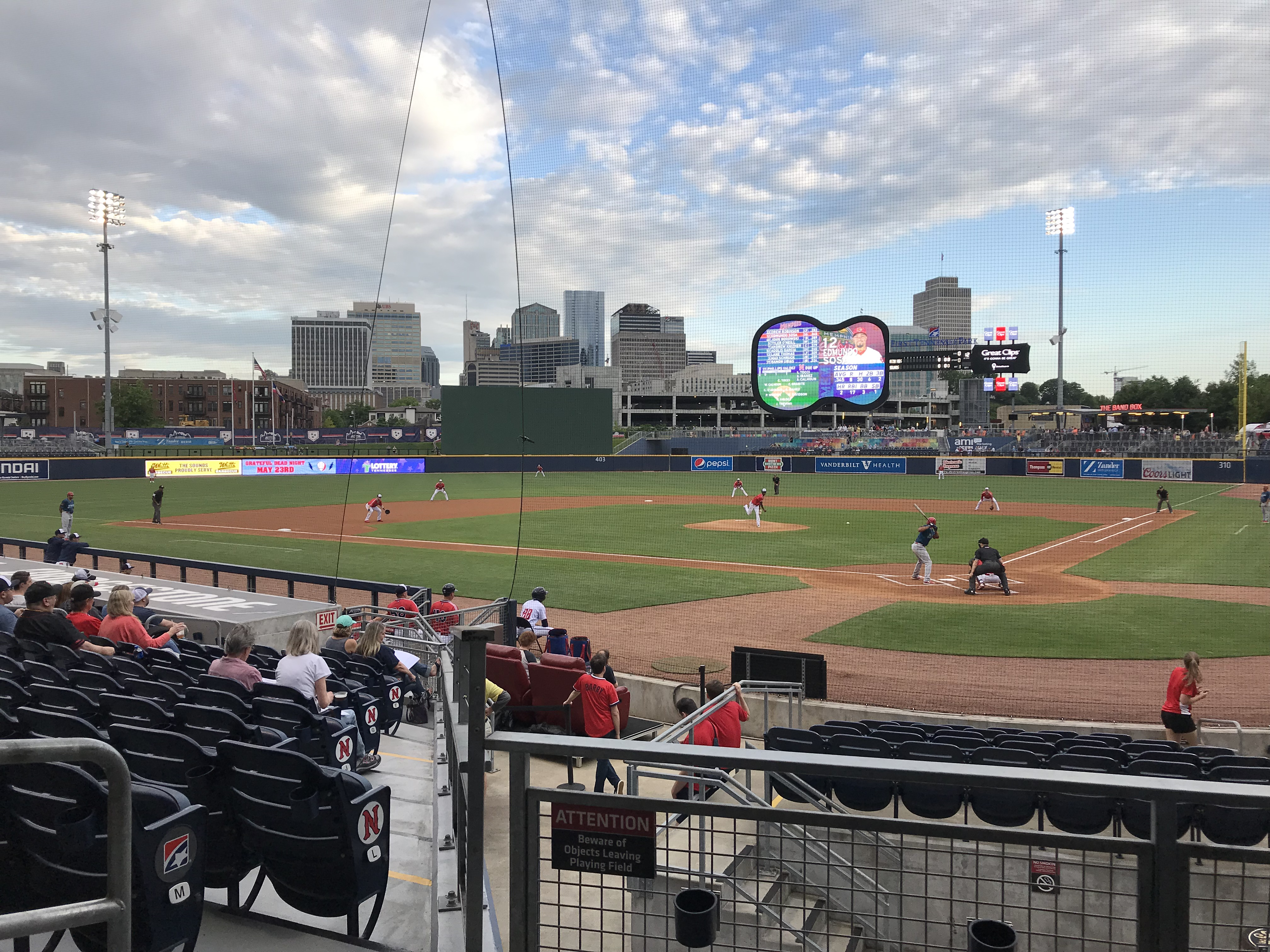
The Sounds versus the Redbirds at First Tennessee Park on May 6, 2019

The Nashville Sounds joined the Triple-A Pacific Coast League (PCL) in 1998 following the disbandment of the American Association after the 1997 campaign. That same season, the Memphis Redbirds were created as a PCL expansion franchise. Owing to their geographic proximity, both clubs were members of the same divisions throughout their PCL membership: the American Conference Eastern Division (1998–2004), American Conference Northern Division (2005–2013), American Conference Southern Division (2014–2018), and American Conference Northern Division (2019–2020).

The first game between the Sounds and Redbirds was played on May 17, 1998, at Memphis' Tim McCarver Stadium with 5,382 people in attendance. In the top of the fourth inning, Nashville's Mark Smith hit a single that scored Jeff Patzke and Chad Hermansen to give the Sounds a 2–0 lead. Smith drove in Patzke and Hermansen again in the sixth with a double and later came home on a Freddy García base hit, making the score 5–0. Memphis scored two runs in the eighth inning and one in the ninth but lost to Nashville, 5–3. Sounds starting pitcher Jimmy Anderson earned the win, Redbirds starter Clint Weibl took the loss, and Jeff McCurry was credited with a save. The Sounds went on to win the 1998 series of 16 games against the Redbirds, 10–6.

Late in the 1999 season, Nashville and the Oklahoma RedHawks were in a race for the division title, but a 1–3 road trip in Memphis to close the season eliminated the Sounds from playoff contention. The clubs tied the 1999 season series, 8–8. An 18–1 Redbirds rout over the Sounds on July 30, 2000, at Nashville's Herschel Greer Stadium is the largest margin of victory between the teams. Memphis scored in every inning but the sixth and eighth while limiting the home team to one run on three hits. Brian Johnson led the Redbirds with five runs batted in (RBI), and Stubby Clapp went 4–4 at the plate and came around to score four times. Since winning the first-ever game of the rivalry series, Nashville led the all-time series until Memphis tied it, 24–24, with a win on August 24. The Sounds won the next day's game and have not relinquished the lead since. Memphis won the 2000 series, 8–7.

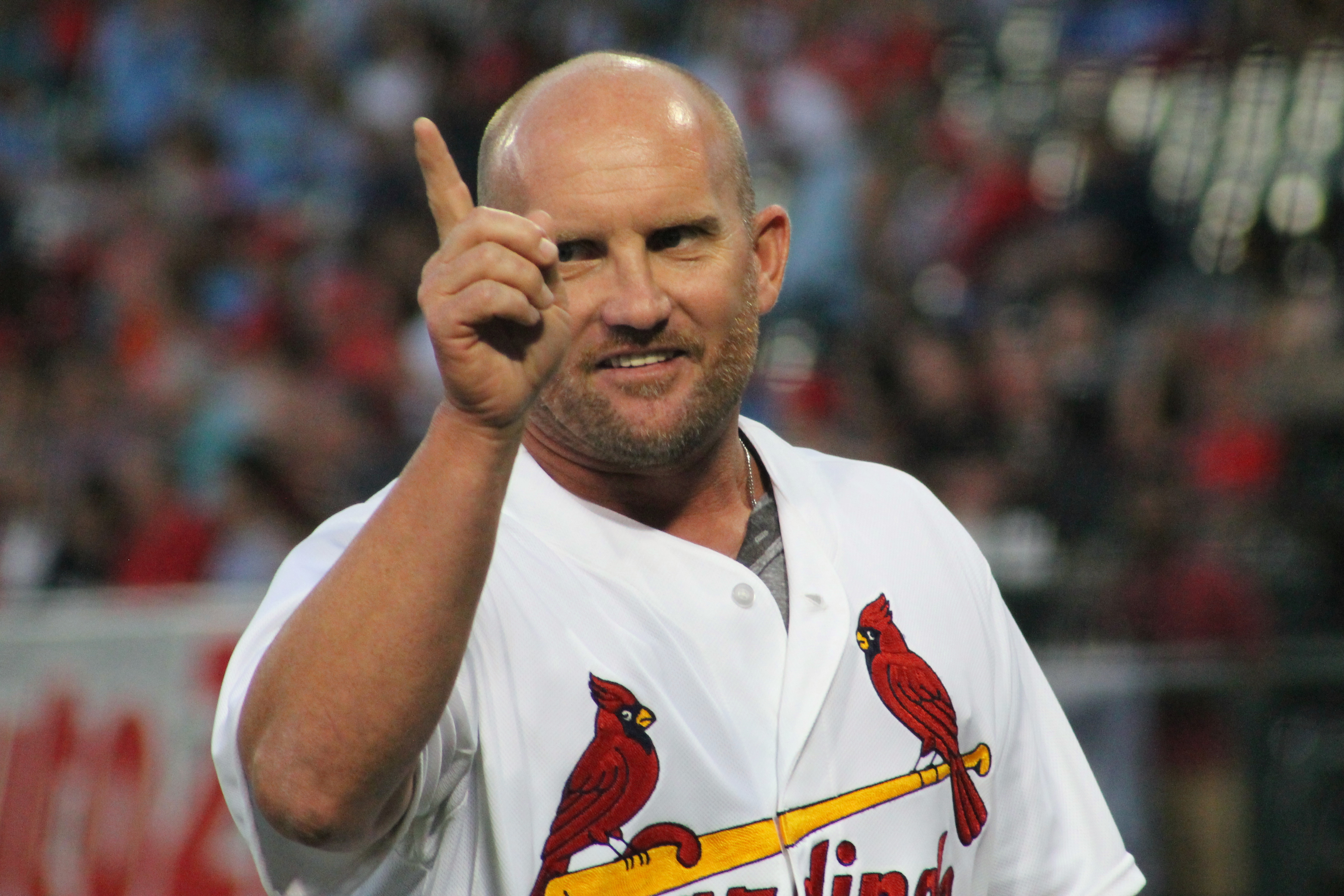
Stubby Clapp went 4–4 in an 18–1 Redbirds win on July 30, 2000, their largest victory over the Sounds.

In celebration of the 100th anniversary of the founding of the National Association of Professional Baseball Leagues, the Redbirds and Sounds were chosen to play in the Minor League Baseball Centennial Game at the new AutoZone Park in Memphis on April 4, 2001. Both teams and the four-man umpiring crew wore early 20th century throwback uniforms. Memphis took a 2–0 lead when Kerry Robinson drove in Keith McDonald and Stubby Clapp on a two-run single in the third inning. Nashville's Humberto Cota tied the game in the seventh with a two-run home run, but Luis Saturria hit a go-ahead leadoff homer in the bottom of the inning to seal the Memphis victory, 3–2, before a home crowd of 15,776. Jason Karnuth was the winning pitcher, Jerry Spradlin earned the save, and Dave Pavlas took the loss. Despite losing the season opener, Nashville won the 2001 series, 10–6, and went on to win the two subsequent seasons, 11–5 and 9–7. Memphis came back to win the 2004 series, 9–7.

From August 13 to September 1, 2005, the Redbirds won six consecutive meetings against the Sounds, their longest head-to-head winning streak. By the season's end, the teams had tied the series, 8–8. The Sounds experienced their longest winning streak against the Redbirds when they won nine games in a row from July 4 to August 24, 2006. In the July 15 game played during that stretch, Sounds hurlers Carlos Villanueva (6 IP), Mike Meyers (2 IP), and Alec Zumwalt (1 IP) combined to pitch a no-hitter against the Redbirds at Greer Stadium. The trio, who struck out 11 batters, was aided offensively by a Nelson Cruz RBI single in the first inning and a Brent Abernathy solo home run in the sixth. Nashville won the season series, 10–6, and repeated by winning the 2007 series, 11–5. Memphis won the 2008 schedule, 10–6. In 2009, the American Northern Division title race came down to the last week of competition, with the Redbirds, Sounds, and Iowa Cubs vying for first place. In the end, Memphis won the division, finishing just two games ahead of Nashville. The Sounds, though placing second, won the rivalry season series, 10–6. Nashville also won the 2010 series, 9–7, but Memphis won 10–6 in 2011.

In 2012, the rivalry was incorporated into a promotion between the teams dubbed the I-40 Cup Series. The name referred to the cities being connected by a stretch of Interstate 40. Whichever of the two teams won the most games played between them was declared the winner and received a trophy cup to keep until the next season. The losing team donated game tickets to a charity selected by the winner. In the event of a season series tie, the previous season's winner remained champion. The Sounds won the first I-40 Cup, 9–7. Memphis won the 2013 cup, 9–7, and retained the two subsequent cups by virtue of tying, 8–8, in 2014 and 2015. The trophy cup, friendly wager, and promotional references to the series were discontinued after the 2015 season.

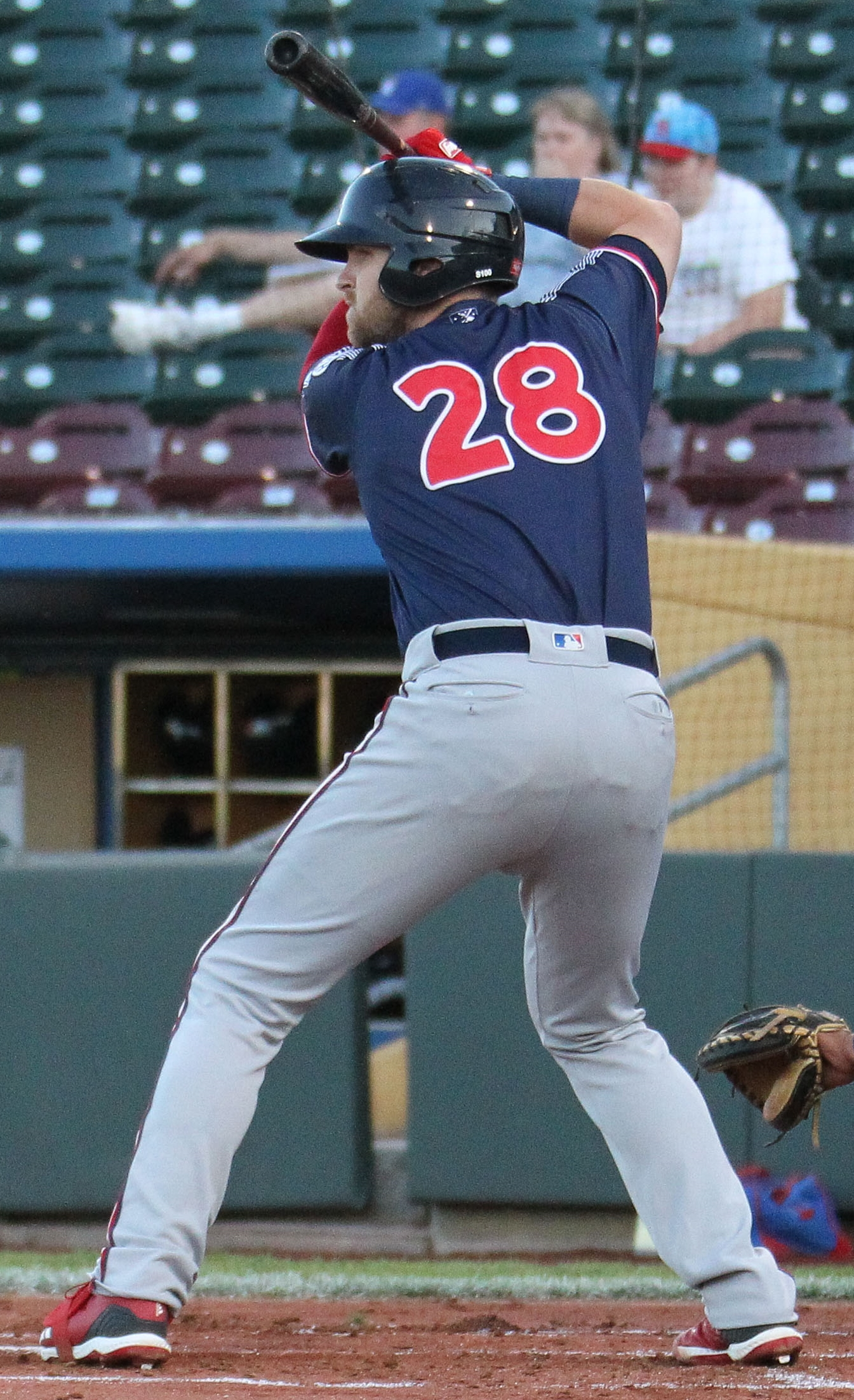
Jett Bandy had a four-RBI game in a 17–11 Sounds win on June 26, 2019, the highest-scoring game of the rivalry.

Memphis won the 2014 American Southern Division title by just two-and-a-half games over the second-place Sounds. The clubs tied the head-to-head series, 8–8, as they also did in 2015 and 2016. The 2016 Sounds clinched the division title in Memphis with a 5–3 win. With Matt Chapman and Renato Núñez on base, Matt McBride scored the winning run with a three-run homer in the fourth.

The Redbirds clinched the 2017 division title in Nashville with a 12–7 victory. This time, the winning run was scored by former Sound Rangel Ravelo via a seventh inning home run. The Redbirds, who finished 22 games ahead of runner-up Nashville, won the 2017 season series, 8–6. The Redbirds again defeated the Sounds in Memphis to win the 2018 division title, 4–3. Down 3–2 in the bottom of the ninth with two outs and two runners on base, Wilfredo Tovar singled on a ground ball to Dustin Fowler in center field scoring Edmundo Sosa to tie the game. On the same play, a fielding error by Fowler allowed Lane Thomas to advance home for the walk-off win. Nashville again wound up in second place, 11 games out of first, but won the 2018 season series, 9–7. The June 26, 2019, game at AutoZone Park is the highest-scoring game in the rivalry's history as the teams combined to score 28 runs. Each Memphis batter had at least one hit; Randy Arozarena led his team with three, and Andrew Knizner drove in four runs. Nashville's Carlos Tocci and Jett Bandy each collected four RBI in the 17–11 Sounds victory. Nashville won the 2019 series, 9–7.

The start of the 2020 season was postponed due to the COVID-19 pandemic before being cancelled on June 30.

==== International League (2021–present) ====
Following the 2020 season, Major League Baseball assumed control of Minor League Baseball in a move to increase player salaries, modernize facility standards, and reduce travel. The Redbirds and Sounds were placed in the Southeastern Division of the newly formed Triple-A East. In 2021, they were initially scheduled to meet 24 times across four 6-game series. However, Opening Day was pushed back a month to temporarily eliminate commercial air travel and give players the opportunity to be vaccinated before the season began. As a result, the 2021 rivalry series was reduced to 18 games. The teams played their first head-to-head game in the new league on May 11 at Nashville's First Horizon Park in which the visiting Redbirds defeated the Sounds, 18–6. They tied the season series at nine wins each.

In 2022, the Triple-A East became known as the International League (IL), the name historically used by the regional circuit prior to the 2021 reorganization, and both teams were realigned into its Western Division. First Horizon Park's single-game attendance record of 12,409 people was set during a game between the Sounds and Redbirds on July 16, 2022. Nashville won the 2022 schedule, 12–9, and repeated with a 13–5 mark in 2023. While the teams tied the 2024 series, 11–11, Nashville won in 2025, 12–6. On July 6, 2025, the Sounds' lead in the all-time series reached a 40-game high, a feat which they matched with a win on June 17, 2026. The most lopsided Sounds win occurred on June 20 of that season, when they defeated the Redbirds, 17–3, at AutoZone Park. The offense was led by Akil Baddoo, who hit a grand slam in the fourth inning and collected seven RBI overall. Nashville's Tyler Black fished a double shy of hitting for the cycle. Memphis won the 2026 IL first-half title with a 10–8 victory at home over Nashville on June 21—the last day of the half. For the first time since 2017, Memphis won the 2026 rivalry, 11–7.

The clubs are scheduled to meet 18 times in 2027, with 12 games in Nashville and 6 games in Memphis.

== Records ==
=== Team records ===
Over 23 years of membership in the Pacific Coast League, the Redbirds won more games than the Sounds in both the regular-season and postseason and captured more titles. Nashville, however, has a better regular-season record after six years in the International League. Through all 29 seasons of the rivalry, Nashville leads Memphis in regular-season wins, while Memphis leads in postseason wins and titles.

Key
| ^ | Categorical leader in each league |
| * | Categorical leader in the all-time series |

Memphis Redbirds records (1998–2026)
| League | Seasons | Regular-season | | Postseason | | Titles | | | | |
| League | Seasons | Record | Win % | Record | Win % | Class | League | Conference | Division | Half season |
|---|---|---|---|---|---|---|---|---|---|---|
| PCL | 1998–2020 | 1,583–1,557^ | .504^ | 30–20^ | .600^ | 1^ | 4^ | 5^ | 6^ | N/A |
| IL | 2021–2026 | 442–431 | .506 | 1–2^ | .000 | 0 | 0 | N/A | 0 | 1^ |
| Totals | 1998–2025 | 2,025–1,988 | .505 | 31–22* | .585* | 1* | 4* | 5* | 6 | 1* |

Nashville Sounds records (1998–2026)
| League | Seasons | Regular-season | | Postseason | | Titles | | | | |
| League | Seasons | Record | Win % | Record | Win % | Class | League | Conference | Division | Half season |
|---|---|---|---|---|---|---|---|---|---|---|
| PCL | 1998–2020 | 1,568–1,565 | .500 | 14–15 | .483 | 0 | 1 | 2 | 5 | N/A |
| IL | 2021–2026 | 487–381^ | .561^ | 0–1 | .000 | 0 | 0 | N/A | 1^ | 0 |
| Totals | 1998–2025 | 2,055–1,946* | .514* | 14–16 | .467 | 0 | 1 | 2 | 6 | 0 |

=== All-time series records ===
As of the completion of the 2026 rivalry series, Nashville leads the 29-year series with a record of 250–214 (.539). The Sounds have won 14 season series, the Redbirds have won 7, and the teams have tied in 7 seasons. Nashville's longest season-series winning streak is three consecutive winning seasons (2001–2003), while Memphis has not won any seasons consecutively. The most lopsided season occurred in 2023 when the Sounds won by an eight-victory margin (13–5).

All-time series records
| Season | Series winner | Memphis wins | Nashville wins |
|---|---|---|---|
| 1998 | Sounds | 6 | 10 |
| 1999 | Tie | 8 | 8 |
| 2000 | Redbirds | 8 | 7 |
| 2001 | Sounds | 6 | 10 |
| 2002 | Sounds | 5 | 11 |
| 2003 | Sounds | 7 | 9 |
| 2004 | Redbirds | 9 | 7 |
| 2005 | Tie | 8 | 8 |
| 2006 | Sounds | 6 | 10 |
| 2007 | Sounds | 5 | 11 |
| 2008 | Redbirds | 10 | 6 |
| 2009 | Sounds | 6 | 10 |
| 2010 | Sounds | 7 | 9 |
| 2011 | Redbirds | 10 | 6 |
| 2012 | Sounds | 7 | 9 |
| 2013 | Redbirds | 9 | 7 |
| 2014 | Tie | 8 | 8 |
| 2015 | Tie | 8 | 8 |
| 2016 | Tie | 8 | 8 |
| 2017 | Redbirds | 8 | 6 |
| 2018 | Sounds | 7 | 9 |
| 2019 | Sounds | 7 | 9 |
| 2020 | Season cancelled | — | — |
| 2021 | Tie | 9 | 9 |
| 2022 | Sounds | 9 | 12 |
| 2023 | Sounds | 5 | 13 |
| 2024 | Tie | 11 | 11 |
| 2025 | Sounds | 6 | 12 |
| 2026 | Redbirds | 11 | 7 |
| 2027 | TBD | — | — |
| Overall | Sounds (14–7–7) | 214 | 250 |

=== Game log ===
Key
| No. | A running total of the number of games played between the Redbirds and Sounds |
| Date (#) | Game date; number in parentheses indicates either the first or second game of a doubleheader |
| Score (#) | Game score; number of innings in a game that was shorter or longer than 9 innings in parentheses |

Game Log
1998: Sounds (10–6); All-time: Sounds (10–6)

| No. | Date | Location | Score | Winning team (Season record) | Losing team (Season record) | All-time leader (Record) | Ref. |
|---|---|---|---|---|---|---|---|
| 1 | May 17 | Memphis | 5–3 | Sounds (1–0) | Redbirds (0–1) | Sounds (1–0) | |
| 2 | May 18 | Memphis | 9–7 | Sounds (2–0) | Redbirds (0–2) | Sounds (2–0) | |
| 3 | May 19 | Memphis | 7–1 | Sounds (3–0) | Redbirds (0–3) | Sounds (3–0) | |
| 4 | May 20 | Memphis | 6–3 | Sounds (4–0) | Redbirds (0–4) | Sounds (4–0) | |
| 5 | July 4 | Nashville | 5–4 | Redbirds (1–4) | Sounds (4–1) | Sounds (4–1) | |
| 6 | July 5 (1) | Nashville | 13–2 (7) | Redbirds (2–4) | Sounds (4–2) | Sounds (4–2) | |
| 7 | July 5 (2) | Nashville | 7–0 (7) | Sounds (5–2) | Redbirds (2–5) | Sounds (5–2) | |
| 8 | July 6 | Nashville | 1–0 | Sounds (6–2) | Redbirds (2–6) | Sounds (6–2) | |
| 9 | August 23 | Memphis | 3–1 | Redbirds (3–6) | Sounds (6–3) | Sounds (6–3) | |
| 10 | August 24 | Memphis | 4–1 | Sounds (7–3) | Redbirds (3–7) | Sounds (7–3) | |
| 11 | August 25 | Memphis | 4–2 | Redbirds (4–7) | Sounds (7–4) | Sounds (7–4) | |
| 12 | August 26 | Memphis | 7–3 | Redbirds (5–7) | Sounds (7–5) | Sounds (7–5) | |
| 13 | August 31 | Nashville | 8–4 | Redbirds (6–7) | Sounds (7–6) | Sounds (7–6) | |
| 14 | September 1 | Nashville | 7–5 | Sounds (8–6) | Redbirds (6–8) | Sounds (8–6) | |
| 15 | September 2 | Nashville | 10–9 | Sounds (9–6) | Redbirds (6–9) | Sounds (9–6) | |
| 16 | September 3 | Nashville | 3–2 | Sounds (10–6) | Redbirds (6–10) | Sounds (10–6) | |

1999: Tie (8–8); All-time: Sounds (18–14)

| No. | Date | Location | Score | Winning team (Season record) | Losing team (Season record) | All-time leader (Record) | Ref. |
|---|---|---|---|---|---|---|---|
| 17 | June 4 | Nashville | 6–4 (12) | Sounds (1–0) | Redbirds (0–1) | Sounds (11–6) | |
| 18 | June 5 | Nashville | 9–7 | Sounds (2–0) | Redbirds (0–2) | Sounds (12–6) | |
| 19 | June 6 | Nashville | 10–5 | Sounds (3–0) | Redbirds (0–3) | Sounds (13–6) | |
| 20 | July 15 (1) | Nashville | 4–2 (7) | Redbirds (1–3) | Sounds (3–1) | Sounds (13–7) | |
| 21 | July 15 (2) | Nashville | 1–0 (7) | Redbirds (2–3) | Sounds (3–2) | Sounds (13–8) | |
| 22 | July 16 | Nashville | 7–0 | Redbirds (3–3) | Sounds (3–3) | Sounds (13–9) | |
| 23 | July 17 | Nashville | 11–2 | Sounds (4–3) | Redbirds (3–4) | Sounds (14–9) | |
| — | July 18 | Nashville | Suspended (rain). Continuation scheduled for July 28 in Memphis. (Note: The July 18, 1999, game was suspended due to rain in the top of the eighth inning with two outs and the score tied, 1–1. It was completed on July 28 prior to the regularly scheduled game in Memphis with the Sounds batting as the "home" team.) | | | | |
| 25 | July 27 | Memphis | 5–4 (11) | Redbirds (4–4) | Sounds (4–4) | Sounds (14–10) | |
| 24 | July 28 (1) | Nashville | 5–2 | Redbirds (5–4) | Sounds (4–5) | Sounds (14–11) | |
| 26 | July 28 (2) | Memphis | 15–4 | Sounds (5–5) | Redbirds (5–5) | Sounds (15–11) | |
| 27 | July 29 | Memphis | 6–1 | Sounds (6–5) | Redbirds (5–6) | Sounds (16–11) | |
| 28 | July 30 | Memphis | 17–5 | Sounds (7–5) | Redbirds (5–7) | Sounds (17–11) | |
| 29 | September 3 | Memphis | 9–6 | Sounds (8–5) | Redbirds (5–8) | Sounds (18–11) | |
| 30 | September 4 | Memphis | 8–5 | Redbirds (6–8) | Sounds (8–6) | Sounds (18–12) | |
| 31 | September 5 | Memphis | 11–6 | Redbirds (7–8) | Sounds (8–7) | Sounds (18–13) | |
| 32 | September 6 | Memphis | 2–1 | Redbirds (8–8) | Sounds (8–8) | Sounds (18–14) | |

2000: Redbirds (8–7); All-time: Sounds (25–22)

| No. | Date | Location | Score | Winning team (Season record) | Losing team (Season record) | All-time leader (Record) | Ref. |
|---|---|---|---|---|---|---|---|
| 33 | June 26 | Nashville | 10–5 | Redbirds (1–0) | Sounds (0–1) | Sounds (18–15) | |
| 34 | June 27 | Nashville | 5–0 | Redbirds (2–0) | Sounds (0–2) | Sounds (18–16) | |
| 35 | June 28 | Nashville | 10–9 (13) | Sounds (1–2) | Redbirds (2–1) | Sounds (19–16) | |
| 36 | June 29 | Nashville | 4–1 | Sounds (2–2) | Redbirds (2–2) | Sounds (20–16) | |
| 37 | July 7 | Memphis | 3–0 | Redbirds (3–2) | Sounds (2–3) | Sounds (20–17) | |
| 38 | July 8 | Memphis | 6–2 | Sounds (3–3) | Redbirds (3–3) | Sounds (21–17) | |
| 39 | July 9 | Memphis | 7–1 | Sounds (4–3) | Redbirds (3–4) | Sounds (22–17) | |
| 40 | July 30 | Nashville | 18–1 | Redbirds (4–4) | Sounds (4–4) | Sounds (22–18) | |
| 41 | July 31 | Nashville | 5–3 | Redbirds (5–4) | Sounds (4–5) | Sounds (22–19) | |
| 42 | August 1 | Nashville | 4–3 | Redbirds (6–4) | Sounds (4–6) | Sounds (22–20) | |
| 43 | August 2 | Nashville | 7–2 | Redbirds (7–4) | Sounds (4–7) | Sounds (22–21) | |
| 44 | August 24 | Memphis | 12–2 | Redbirds (8–4) | Sounds (4–8) | Tie (22–22) | |
| 45 | August 25 | Memphis | 6–3 | Sounds (5–8) | Redbirds (8–5) | Sounds (23–22) | |
| 46 | August 26 | Memphis | 11–9 | Sounds (6–8) | Redbirds (8–6) | Sounds (24–22) | |
| 47 | August 27 | Memphis | 7–5 | Sounds (7–8) | Redbirds (8–7) | Sounds (25–22) | |

2001: Sounds (10–6); All-time: Sounds (35–28)

| No. | Date | Location | Score | Winning team (Season record) | Losing team (Season record) | All-time leader (Record) | Ref. |
|---|---|---|---|---|---|---|---|
| 48 | April 4 | Memphis | 3–2 | Redbirds (1–0) | Sounds (0–1) | Sounds (25–23) | |
| 49 | May 9 | Memphis | 5–4 | Redbirds (2–0) | Sounds (0–2) | Sounds (25–24) | |
| 50 | May 10 | Memphis | 3–1 | Sounds (1–2) | Redbirds (2–1) | Sounds (26–24) | |
| 51 | May 11 | Memphis | 3–1 | Sounds (2–2) | Redbirds (2–2) | Sounds (27–24) | |
| 52 | May 21 | Nashville | 9–1 | Redbirds (3–2) | Sounds (2–3) | Sounds (27–25) | |
| 53 | May 22 | Nashville | 2–1 | Sounds (3–3) | Redbirds (3–3) | Sounds (28–25) | |
| 54 | May 23 | Nashville | 8–7 (10) | Redbirds (4–3) | Sounds (3–4) | Sounds (28–26) | |
| 55 | May 24 | Nashville | 7–3 | Sounds (4–4) | Redbirds (4–4) | Sounds (29–26) | |
| 56 | June 18 | Nashville | 7–0 | Sounds (5–4) | Redbirds (4–5) | Sounds (30–26) | |
| 57 | June 19 | Nashville | 8–6 | Sounds (6–4) | Redbirds (4–6) | Sounds (31–26) | |
| 58 | June 20 | Nashville | 5–1 | Sounds (7–4) | Redbirds (4–7) | Sounds (32–26) | |
| 59 | June 21 | Nashville | 10–6 (10) | Redbirds (5–7) | Sounds (7–5) | Sounds (32–27) | |
| 60 | August 27 | Memphis | 9–2 | Sounds (8–5) | Redbirds (5–8) | Sounds (33–27) | |
| 61 | August 28 | Memphis | 12–5 | Sounds (9–5) | Redbirds (5–9) | Sounds (34–27) | |
| 62 | August 29 | Memphis | 4–0 | Redbirds (6–9) | Sounds (9–6) | Sounds (34–28) | |
| 63 | August 30 | Memphis | 5–3 | Sounds (10–6) | Redbirds (6–10) | Sounds (35–28) | |

2002: Sounds (11–5); All-time: Sounds (46–33)

| No. | Date | Location | Score | Winning team (Season record) | Losing team (Season record) | All-time leader (Record) | Ref. |
|---|---|---|---|---|---|---|---|
| 64 | April 25 | Nashville | 6–4 | Sounds (1–0) | Redbirds (0–1) | Sounds (36–28) | |
| 65 | April 26 | Nashville | 3–1 | Redbirds (1–1) | Sounds (1–1) | Sounds (36–29) | |
| 66 | April 27 | Nashville | 6–0 | Redbirds (2–1) | Sounds (1–2) | Sounds (36–30) | |
| — | April 28 | Nashville | Postponed (rain). Rescheduled for August 23 as part of a doubleheader. | | | | |
| 67 | July 11 | Memphis | 9–2 | Sounds (2–2) | Redbirds (2–2) | Sounds (37–30) | |
| 68 | July 12 | Memphis | 6–1 | Sounds (3–2) | Redbirds (2–3) | Sounds (38–30) | |
| 69 | July 13 | Memphis | 7–5 | Sounds (4–2) | Redbirds (2–4) | Sounds (39–30) | |
| — | July 14 | Memphis | Suspended (rain). Continuation scheduled for August 9 as part of a doubleheader. (Note: The July 14, 2002, game was suspended due to rain in the second inning with no score. It was completed on August 9 prior to the regularly scheduled game in Memphis, which had been shortened to seven innings.) | | | | |
| 70 | August 9 (1) | Memphis | 6–5 | Redbirds (3–4) | Sounds (4–3) | Sounds (39–31) | |
| 71 | August 9 (2) | Memphis | 3–2 (9) | Sounds (5–3) | Redbirds (3–5) | Sounds (40–31) | |
| 72 | August 10 | Memphis | 8–3 | Sounds (6–3) | Redbirds (3–6) | Sounds (41–31) | |
| 73 | August 11 | Memphis | 2–1 | Sounds (7–3) | Redbirds (3–7) | Sounds (42–31) | |
| 74 | August 12 | Memphis | 6–3 | Sounds (8–3) | Redbirds (3–8) | Sounds (43–31) | |
| 75 | August 22 | Nashville | 3–1 | Redbirds (4–8) | Sounds (8–4) | Sounds (43–32) | |
| 76 | August 23 (1) | Nashville | 3–2 (7) | Sounds (9–4) | Redbirds (4–9) | Sounds (44–32) | |
| 77 | August 23 (2) | Nashville | 5–0 (7) | Sounds (10–4) | Redbirds (4–10) | Sounds (45–32) | |
| 78 | August 24 | Nashville | 7–2 | Redbirds (5–10) | Sounds (10–5) | Sounds (45–33) | |
| 79 | August 25 | Nashville | 2–1 | Sounds (11–5) | Redbirds (5–11) | Sounds (46–33) | |

2003: Sounds (9–7); All-time: Sounds (55–40)

| No. | Date | Location | Score | Winning team (Season record) | Losing team (Season record) | All-time leader (Record) | Ref. |
|---|---|---|---|---|---|---|---|
| 80 | April 15 | Nashville | 3–2 | Sounds (1–0) | Redbirds (0–1) | Sounds (47–33) | |
| 81 | April 16 | Nashville | 2–1 (11) | Sounds (2–0) | Redbirds (0–2) | Sounds (48–33) | |
| 82 | April 17 | Nashville | 5–1 | Sounds (3–0) | Redbirds (0–3) | Sounds (49–33) | |
| 83 | April 18 | Nashville | 6–2 | Sounds (4–0) | Redbirds (0–4) | Sounds (50–33) | |
| 84 | May 10 | Memphis | 6–1 | Redbirds (1–4) | Sounds (4–1) | Sounds (50–34) | |
| 85 | May 11 | Memphis | 10–4 | Redbirds (2–4) | Sounds (4–2) | Sounds (50–35) | |
| 86 | May 12 | Memphis | 4–3 | Sounds (5–2) | Redbirds (2–5) | Sounds (51–35) | |
| 87 | May 13 | Memphis | 13–4 | Redbirds (3–5) | Sounds (5–3) | Sounds (51–36) | |
| 88 | May 19 | Nashville | 3–0 | Sounds (6–3) | Redbirds (3–6) | Sounds (52–36) | |
| 89 | May 20 | Nashville | 9–2 | Sounds (7–3) | Redbirds (3–7) | Sounds (53–36) | |
| 90 | May 21 | Nashville | 2–0 | Redbirds (4–7) | Sounds (7–4) | Sounds (53–37) | |
| 91 | May 22 | Nashville | 2–1 | Sounds (8–4) | Redbirds (4–8) | Sounds (54–37) | |
| 92 | June 26 | Memphis | 3–2 | Redbirds (5–8) | Sounds (8–5) | Sounds (54–38) | |
| 93 | June 27 | Memphis | 2–1 (13) | Redbirds (6–8) | Sounds (8–6) | Sounds (54–39) | |
| 94 | June 28 | Memphis | 3–2 | Sounds (9–6) | Redbirds (6–9) | Sounds (55–39) | |
| 95 | June 29 | Memphis | 7–4 | Redbirds (7–9) | Sounds (9–7) | Sounds (55–40) | |

2004: Redbirds (9–7); All-time: Sounds (62–49)

| No. | Date | Location | Score | Winning team (Season record) | Losing team (Season record) | All-time leader (Record) | Ref. |
|---|---|---|---|---|---|---|---|
| 96 | May 3 | Nashville | 8–7 | Sounds (1–0) | Redbirds (0–1) | Sounds (56–40) | |
| 97 | May 4 | Nashville | 5–1 | Sounds (2–0) | Redbirds (0–2) | Sounds (57–40) | |
| 98 | May 5 | Nashville | 11–9 (10) | Redbirds (1–2) | Sounds (2–1) | Sounds (57–41) | |
| 99 | May 6 | Nashville | 4–2 | Sounds (3–1) | Redbirds (1–3) | Sounds (58–41) | |
| 100 | July 4 | Memphis | 6–3 | Redbirds (2–3) | Sounds (3–2) | Sounds (58–42) | |
| 101 | July 5 | Memphis | 2–1 | Sounds (4–2) | Redbirds (2–4) | Sounds (59–42) | |
| 102 | July 6 | Memphis | 5–4 | Redbirds (3–4) | Sounds (4–3) | Sounds (59–43) | |
| 103 | July 7 | Memphis | 3–1 (10) | Sounds (5–3) | Redbirds (3–5) | Sounds (60–43) | |
| 104 | August 13 | Nashville | 6–4 | Redbirds (4–5) | Sounds (5–4) | Sounds (60–44) | |
| 105 | August 14 (1) | Nashville | 3–1 (7) | Redbirds (5–5) | Sounds (5–5) | Sounds (60–45) | |
| 106 | August 14 (2) | Nashville | 6–4 (7) | Redbirds (6–5) | Sounds (5–6) | Sounds (60–46) | |
| 107 | August 15 | Nashville | 11–2 | Redbirds (7–5) | Sounds (5–7) | Sounds (60–47) | |
| 108 | September 3 | Memphis | 9–8 | Sounds (6–7) | Redbirds (7–6) | Sounds (61–47) | |
| 109 | September 4 | Memphis | 12–7 | Redbirds (8–6) | Sounds (6–8) | Sounds (61–48) | |
| 110 | September 5 | Memphis | 9–7 | Redbirds (9–6) | Sounds (6–9) | Sounds (61–49) | |
| 111 | September 6 | Memphis | 5–0 | Sounds (7–9) | Redbirds (9–7) | Sounds (62–49) | |

2005: Tie (8–8); All-time: Sounds (70–57)

| No. | Date | Location | Score | Winning team (Season record) | Losing team (Season record) | All-time leader (Record) | Ref. |
|---|---|---|---|---|---|---|---|
| 112 | June 30 | Nashville | 6–3 | Sounds (1–0) | Redbirds (0–1) | Sounds (63–49) | |
| 113 | July 1 | Nashville | 7–5 | Sounds (2–0) | Redbirds (0–2) | Sounds (64–49) | |
| 114 | July 2 | Nashville | 6–1 | Redbirds (1–2) | Sounds (2–1) | Sounds (64–50) | |
| 115 | July 3 | Nashville | 8–7 (10) | Sounds (3–1) | Redbirds (1–3) | Sounds (65–50) | |
| 116 | July 18 | Nashville | 9–3 | Sounds (4–1) | Redbirds (1–4) | Sounds (66–50) | |
| 117 | July 19 | Nashville | 5–4 (12) | Sounds (5–1) | Redbirds (1–5) | Sounds (67–50) | |
| 118 | July 20 | Nashville | 7–6 | Sounds (6–1) | Redbirds (1–6) | Sounds (68–50) | |
| 119 | July 21 | Nashville | 3–1 (10) | Redbirds (2–6) | Sounds (6–2) | Sounds (68–51) | |
| 120 | August 12 | Memphis | 8–2 | Sounds (7–2) | Redbirds (2–7) | Sounds (69–51) | |
| 121 | August 13 | Memphis | 11–2 | Redbirds (3–7) | Sounds (7–3) | Sounds (69–52) | |
| 122 | August 14 | Memphis | 1–0 | Redbirds (4–7) | Sounds (7–4) | Sounds (69–53) | |
| 123 | August 15 | Memphis | 5–4 | Redbirds (5–7) | Sounds (7–5) | Sounds (69–54) | |
| — | August 29 | Memphis | Postponed (rain). Rescheduled for August 31 as part of a doubleheader. | | | | |
| — | August 30 | Memphis | Postponed (wet grounds). Rescheduled for September 1 as part of a doubleheader. | | | | |
| 124 | August 31 (1) | Memphis | 3–0 (7) | Redbirds (6–7) | Sounds (7–6) | Sounds (69–55) | |
| 125 | August 31 (2) | Memphis | 1–0 (7) | Redbirds (7–7) | Sounds (7–7) | Sounds (69–56) | |
| 126 | September 1 (1) | Memphis | 1–0 (7) | Redbirds (8–7) | Sounds (7–8) | Sounds (69–57) | |
| 127 | September 1 (2) | Memphis | 4–3 (7) | Sounds (8–8) | Redbirds (8–8) | Sounds (70–57) | |

2006: Sounds (10–6); All-time: Sounds (80–63)

| No. | Date | Location | Score | Winning team (Season record) | Losing team (Season record) | All-time leader (Record) | Ref. |
|---|---|---|---|---|---|---|---|
| 128 | June 26 | Nashville | 2–1 (10) | Redbirds (1–0) | Sounds (0–1) | Sounds (70–58) | |
| 129 | June 27 | Nashville | 3–2 | Sounds (1–1) | Redbirds (1–1) | Sounds (71–58) | |
| 130 | June 28 | Nashville | 11–4 | Redbirds (2–1) | Sounds (1–2) | Sounds (71–59) | |
| 131 | June 29 | Nashville | 5–1 | Redbirds (3–1) | Sounds (1–3) | Sounds (71–60) | |
| 132 | July 4 | Memphis | 4–1 | Sounds (2–3) | Redbirds (3–2) | Sounds (72–60) | |
| 133 | July 5 | Memphis | 3–2 | Sounds (3–3) | Redbirds (3–3) | Sounds (73–60) | |
| 134 | July 6 | Memphis | 5–3 | Sounds (4–3) | Redbirds (3–4) | Sounds (74–60) | |
| 135 | July 13 | Nashville | 8–0 | Sounds (5–3) | Redbirds (3–5) | Sounds (75–60) | |
| 136 | July 14 | Nashville | 8–3 | Sounds (6–3) | Redbirds (3–6) | Sounds (76–60) | |
| 137 | July 15 | Nashville | 2–0 | Sounds (7–3) | Redbirds (3–7) | Sounds (77–60) | |
| 138 | July 16 | Nashville | 6–3 | Sounds (8–3) | Redbirds (3–8) | Sounds (78–60) | |
| 139 | August 23 | Memphis | 5–0 | Sounds (9–3) | Redbirds (3–9) | Sounds (79–60) | |
| 140 | August 24 | Memphis | 4–2 (12) | Sounds (10–3) | Redbirds (3–10) | Sounds (80–60) | |
| 141 | August 25 | Memphis | 8–7 | Redbirds (4–10) | Sounds (10–4) | Sounds (80–61) | |
| 142 | August 26 | Memphis | 2–1 (10) | Redbirds (5–10) | Sounds (10–5) | Sounds (80–62) | |
| 143 | August 27 | Memphis | 2–0 | Redbirds (6–10) | Sounds (10–6) | Sounds (80–63) | |

2007: Sounds (11–5); All-time: Sounds (91–68)

| No. | Date | Location | Score | Winning team (Season record) | Losing team (Season record) | All-time leader (Record) | Ref. |
|---|---|---|---|---|---|---|---|
| 144 | May 21 | Nashville | 6–5 | Redbirds (1–0) | Sounds (0–1) | Sounds (80–64) | |
| 145 | May 22 | Nashville | 3–1 | Sounds (1–1) | Redbirds (1–1) | Sounds (81–64) | |
| 146 | May 23 | Nashville | 8–5 | Redbirds (2–1) | Sounds (1–2) | Sounds (81–65) | |
| 147 | May 24 | Nashville | 9–5 | Sounds (2–2) | Redbirds (2–2) | Sounds (82–65) | |
| 148 | June 11 | Memphis | 7–1 | Sounds (3–2) | Redbirds (2–3) | Sounds (83–65) | |
| 149 | June 12 | Memphis | 2–1 | Redbirds (3–3) | Sounds (3–3) | Sounds (83–66) | |
| 150 | June 13 | Memphis | 6–5 | Sounds (4–3) | Redbirds (3–4) | Sounds (84–66) | |
| 151 | June 14 | Memphis | 4–0 | Sounds (5–3) | Redbirds (3–5) | Sounds (85–66) | |
| 152 | July 12 | Nashville | 7–1 | Sounds (6–3) | Redbirds (3–6) | Sounds (86–66) | |
| 153 | July 13 | Nashville | 10–5 | Redbirds (4–6) | Sounds (6–4) | Sounds (86–67) | |
| 154 | July 14 | Nashville | 5–2 | Sounds (7–4) | Redbirds (4–7) | Sounds (87–67) | |
| 155 | July 15 | Nashville | 2–1 (10) | Sounds (8–4) | Redbirds (4–8) | Sounds (88–67) | |
| 156 | August 31 | Memphis | 4–3 | Redbirds (5–8) | Sounds (8–5) | Sounds (88–68) | |
| 157 | September 1 | Memphis | 8–5 | Sounds (9–5) | Redbirds (5–9) | Sounds (89–68) | |
| 158 | September 2 | Memphis | 5–4 | Sounds (10–5) | Redbirds (5–10) | Sounds (90–68) | |
| 159 | September 3 | Memphis | 3–1 | Sounds (11–5) | Redbirds (5–11) | Sounds (91–68) | |

2008: Redbirds (10–6); All-time: Sounds (97–78)

| No. | Date | Location | Score | Winning team (Season record) | Losing team (Season record) | All-time leader (Record) | Ref. |
|---|---|---|---|---|---|---|---|
| 160 | May 19 | Nashville | 7–3 | Sounds (1–0) | Redbirds (0–1) | Sounds (92–68) | |
| 161 | May 20 | Nashville | 4–1 | Redbirds (1–1) | Sounds (1–1) | Sounds (92–69) | |
| 162 | May 21 | Nashville | 7–6 | Redbirds (2–1) | Sounds (1–2) | Sounds (92–70) | |
| 163 | May 22 | Nashville | 10–2 | Redbirds (3–1) | Sounds (1–3) | Sounds (92–71) | |
| 164 | May 23 | Memphis | 5–4 | Redbirds (4–1) | Sounds (1–4) | Sounds (92–72) | |
| 165 | May 24 | Memphis | 11–4 | Sounds (2–4) | Redbirds (4–2) | Sounds (93–72) | |
| 166 | May 25 | Memphis | 8–7 (12) | Sounds (3–4) | Redbirds (4–3) | Sounds (94–72) | |
| 167 | May 26 | Memphis | 9–4 | Redbirds (5–3) | Sounds (3–5) | Sounds (94–73) | |
| 168 | June 21 | Nashville | 8–5 | Sounds (4–5) | Redbirds (5–4) | Sounds (95–73) | |
| 169 | June 22 | Nashville | 4–1 | Redbirds (6–4) | Sounds (4–6) | Sounds (95–74) | |
| 170 | June 23 | Nashville | 8–1 | Redbirds (7–4) | Sounds (4–7) | Sounds (95–75) | |
| 171 | June 24 | Nashville | 8–6 | Redbirds (8–4) | Sounds (4–8) | Sounds (95–76) | |
| 172 | June 30 | Memphis | 5–4 (10) | Sounds (5–8) | Redbirds (8–5) | Sounds (96–76) | |
| 173 | July 1 | Memphis | 5–1 | Sounds (6–8) | Redbirds (8–6) | Sounds (97–76) | |
| 174 | July 2 | Memphis | 3–2 | Redbirds (9–6) | Sounds (6–9) | Sounds (97–77) | |
| 175 | July 3 | Memphis | 5–1 | Redbirds (10–6) | Sounds (6–10) | Sounds (97–78) | |

2009: Sounds (10–6); All-time: Sounds (107–84)

| No. | Date | Location | Score | Winning team (Season record) | Losing team (Season record) | All-time leader (Record) | Ref. |
|---|---|---|---|---|---|---|---|
| 176 | April 21 | Memphis | 9–1 | Sounds (1–0) | Redbirds (0–1) | Sounds (98–78) | |
| 177 | April 22 | Memphis | 3–1 | Redbirds (1–1) | Sounds (1–1) | Sounds (98–79) | |
| 178 | April 23 | Memphis | 7–6 | Sounds (2–1) | Redbirds (1–2) | Sounds (99–79) | |
| 179 | April 24 | Memphis | 2–1 | Redbirds (2–2) | Sounds (2–2) | Sounds (99–80) | |
| 180 | June 11 | Nashville | 11–3 | Sounds (3–2) | Redbirds (2–3) | Sounds (100–80) | |
| 181 | June 12 | Nashville | 5–1 | Sounds (4–2) | Redbirds (2–4) | Sounds (101–80) | |
| 182 | June 13 | Nashville | 4–3 (10) | Sounds (5–2) | Redbirds (2–5) | Sounds (102–80) | |
| 183 | June 14 | Nashville | 14–5 | Sounds (6–2) | Redbirds (2–6) | Sounds (103–80) | |
| 184 | July 20 | Memphis | 7–6 | Sounds (7–2) | Redbirds (2–7) | Sounds (104–80) | |
| — | July 21 | Memphis | Postponed (rain). Rescheduled for July 22 as part of a doubleheader. | | | | |
| 185 | July 22 (1) | Memphis | 1–0 (8) | Sounds (8–2) | Redbirds (2–8) | Sounds (105–80) | |
| 186 | July 22 (2) | Memphis | 5–1 (7) | Redbirds (3–8) | Sounds (8–3) | Sounds (105–81) | |
| 187 | July 23 | Memphis | 5–1 | Redbirds (4–8) | Sounds (8–4) | Sounds (105–82) | |
| 188 | August 31 | Nashville | 6–5 (12) | Sounds (9–4) | Redbirds (4–9) | Sounds (106–82) | |
| 189 | September 1 | Nashville | 9–1 | Redbirds (5–9) | Sounds (9–5) | Sounds (106–83) | |
| 190 | September 2 | Nashville | 5–1 | Redbirds (6–9) | Sounds (9–6) | Sounds (106–84) | |
| 191 | September 3 | Nashville | 7–6 | Sounds (10–6) | Redbirds (6–10) | Sounds (107–84) | |

2010: Sounds (9–7); All-time: Sounds (116–91)

| No. | Date | Location | Score | Winning team (Season record) | Losing team (Season record) | All-time leader (Record) | Ref. |
|---|---|---|---|---|---|---|---|
| 192 | April 29 | Nashville | 4–2 | Sounds (1–0) | Redbirds (0–1) | Sounds (108–84) | |
| 193 | April 30 | Nashville | 7–4 | Sounds (2–0) | Redbirds (0–2) | Sounds (109–84) | |
| — | May 1 | Nashville | Postponed (rain). Rescheduled for June 15 as part of a doubleheader. | | | | |
| — | May 2 | Nashville | Postponed (rain). Rescheduled for June 17 as part of a doubleheader. | | | | |
| 194 | June 14 | Nashville | 7–5 | Redbirds (1–2) | Sounds (2–1) | Sounds (109–85) | |
| 195 | June 15 (1) | Nashville | 2–1 (9) | Redbirds (2–2) | Sounds (2–2) | Sounds (109–86) | |
| 196 | June 15 (2) | Nashville | 8–3 (7) | Sounds (3–2) | Redbirds (2–3) | Sounds (110–86) | |
| 197 | June 16 | Nashville | 9–0 | Sounds (4–2) | Redbirds (2–4) | Sounds (111–86) | |
| — | June 17 (1) | Nashville | Postponed (wet grounds). Rescheduled for June 23 as part of a doubleheader. | | | | |
| — | June 17 (2) | Nashville | Postponed (wet grounds). Rescheduled for July 9 as part of a doubleheader. | | | | |
| 198 | June 22 | Memphis | 6–3 | Sounds (5–2) | Redbirds (2–5) | Sounds (112–86) | |
| 199 | June 23 (1) | Memphis | 7–1 (7) | Redbirds (3–5) | Sounds (5–3) | Sounds (112–87) | |
| 200 | June 23 (2) | Memphis | 11–7 (7) | Redbirds (4–5) | Sounds (5–4) | Sounds (112–88) | |
| 201 | June 24 | Memphis | 7–0 | Sounds (6–4) | Redbirds (4–6) | Sounds (113–88) | |
| 202 | June 25 | Memphis | 7–6 | Redbirds (5–6) | Sounds (6–5) | Sounds (113–89) | |
| 203 | July 8 | Memphis | 3–0 | Redbirds (6–6) | Sounds (6–6) | Sounds (113–90) | |
| 204 | July 9 (1) | Memphis | 6–4 (7) | Sounds (7–6) | Redbirds (6–7) | Sounds (114–90) | |
| 205 | July 9 (2) | Memphis | 6–5 (7) | Sounds (8–6) | Redbirds (6–8) | Sounds (115–90) | |
| 206 | July 10 | Memphis | 5–1 | Sounds (9–6) | Redbirds (6–9) | Sounds (116–90) | |
| 207 | July 11 | Memphis | 5–1 | Redbirds (7–9) | Sounds (9–7) | Sounds (116–91) | |

2011: Redbirds (10–6); All-time: Sounds (122–101)

| No. | Date | Location | Score | Winning team (Season record) | Losing team (Season record) | All-time leader (Record) | Ref. |
|---|---|---|---|---|---|---|---|
| 208 | June 17 | Memphis | 1–0 | Redbirds (1–0) | Sounds (0–1) | Sounds (116–92) | |
| 209 | June 18 | Memphis | 7–6 (10) | Redbirds (2–0) | Sounds (0–2) | Sounds (116–93) | |
| 210 | June 19 | Memphis | 5–3 | Sounds (1–2) | Redbirds (2–1) | Sounds (117–93) | |
| 211 | June 20 | Memphis | 5–4 | Redbirds (3–1) | Sounds (1–3) | Sounds (117–94) | |
| 212 | July 4 | Nashville | 5–4 | Sounds (2–3) | Redbirds (3–2) | Sounds (118–94) | |
| 213 | July 5 | Nashville | 9–8 | Sounds (3–3) | Redbirds (3–3) | Sounds (119–94) | |
| 214 | July 6 | Nashville | 6–5 (13) | Redbirds (4–3) | Sounds (3–4) | Sounds (119–95) | |
| 215 | August 24 | Nashville | 5–4 | Redbirds (5–3) | Sounds (3–5) | Sounds (119–96) | |
| 216 | August 25 | Nashville | 9–6 | Redbirds (6–3) | Sounds (3–6) | Sounds (119–97) | |
| 217 | August 26 | Nashville | 7–1 | Sounds (4–6) | Redbirds (6–4) | Sounds (120–97) | |
| 218 | August 27 | Nashville | 6–3 | Sounds (5–6) | Redbirds (6–5) | Sounds (121–97) | |
| 219 | August 28 | Nashville | 7–5 | Redbirds (7–5) | Sounds (5–7) | Sounds (121–98) | |
| 220 | September 2 | Memphis | 7–5 | Redbirds (8–5) | Sounds (5–8) | Sounds (121–99) | |
| 221 | September 3 | Memphis | 4–1 | Redbirds (9–5) | Sounds (5–9) | Sounds (121–100) | |
| 222 | September 4 | Memphis | 5–2 | Redbirds (10–5) | Sounds (5–10) | Sounds (121–101) | |
| 223 | September 5 | Memphis | 10–2 | Sounds (6–10) | Redbirds (10–6) | Sounds (122–101) | |

2012: Sounds (9–7); All-time: Sounds (131–108)

| No. | Date | Location | Score | Winning team (Season record) | Losing team (Season record) | All-time leader (Record) | Ref. |
|---|---|---|---|---|---|---|---|
| 224 | June 11 | Memphis | 10–4 | Sounds (1–0) | Redbirds (0–1) | Sounds (123–101) | |
| 225 | June 12 | Memphis | 2–0 | Redbirds (1–1) | Sounds (1–1) | Sounds (123–102) | |
| 226 | June 13 | Memphis | 5–4 | Sounds (2–1) | Redbirds (1–2) | Sounds (124–102) | |
| 227 | July 4 | Memphis | 6–4 | Sounds (3–1) | Redbirds (1–3) | Sounds (125–102) | |
| 228 | July 5 | Memphis | 6–1 | Redbirds (2–3) | Sounds (3–2) | Sounds (125–103) | |
| 229 | July 6 | Memphis | 2–0 | Sounds (4–2) | Redbirds (2–4) | Sounds (126–103) | |
| 230 | July 7 | Memphis | 5–2 | Sounds (5–2) | Redbirds (2–5) | Sounds (127–103) | |
| 231 | July 8 | Memphis | 2–0 | Sounds (6–2) | Redbirds (2–6) | Sounds (128–103) | |
| 232 | July 24 | Nashville | 4–1 | Sounds (7–2) | Redbirds (2–7) | Sounds (129–103) | |
| 233 | July 25 | Nashville | 7–1 | Sounds (8–2) | Redbirds (2–8) | Sounds (130–103) | |
| 234 | July 26 | Nashville | 7–3 | Sounds (9–2) | Redbirds (2–9) | Sounds (131–103) | |
| 235 | July 27 | Nashville | 4–3 (10) | Redbirds (3–9) | Sounds (9–3) | Sounds (131–104) | |
| 236 | August 31 | Nashville | 5–1 | Redbirds (4–9) | Sounds (9–4) | Sounds (131–105) | |
| 237 | September 1 | Nashville | 5–4 (10) | Redbirds (5–9) | Sounds (9–5) | Sounds (131–106) | |
| 238 | September 2 | Nashville | 10–1 | Redbirds (6–9) | Sounds (9–6) | Sounds (131–107) | |
| 239 | September 3 | Nashville | 2–1 | Redbirds (7–9) | Sounds (9–7) | Sounds (131–108) | |

2013: Redbirds (9–7); All-time: Sounds (138–117)

| No. | Date | Location | Score | Winning team (Season record) | Losing team (Season record) | All-time leader (Record) | Ref. |
|---|---|---|---|---|---|---|---|
| 240 | April 25 | Nashville | 5–2 | Sounds (1–0) | Redbirds (0–1) | Sounds (132–108) | |
| 241 | April 26 | Nashville | 2–1 | Sounds (2–0) | Redbirds (0–2) | Sounds (133–108) | |
| — | April 27 | Nashville | Postponed (rain). Rescheduled for April 28 as part of a doubleheader. | | | | |
| 242 | April 28 (1) | Nashville | 1–0 (7) | Redbirds (1–2) | Sounds (2–1) | Sounds (133–109) | |
| 243 | April 28 (2) | Nashville | 2–1 (7) | Redbirds (2–2) | Sounds (2–2) | Sounds (133–110) | |
| 244 | June 6 | Memphis | 2–1 | Sounds (3–2) | Redbirds (2–3) | Sounds (134–110) | |
| 245 | June 7 | Memphis | 2–1 | Redbirds (3–3) | Sounds (3–3) | Sounds (134–111) | |
| 246 | June 8 | Memphis | 7–1 | Sounds (4–3) | Redbirds (3–4) | Sounds (135–111) | |
| 247 | June 9 | Memphis | 5–3 | Sounds (5–3) | Redbirds (3–5) | Sounds (136–111) | |
| 248 | July 4 | Memphis | 7–0 | Sounds (6–3) | Redbirds (3–6) | Sounds (137–111) | |
| 249 | July 5 | Memphis | 6–2 | Redbirds (4–6) | Sounds (6–4) | Sounds (137–112) | |
| 250 | July 6 | Memphis | 7–2 | Redbirds (5–6) | Sounds (6–5) | Sounds (137–113) | |
| 251 | July 7 | Memphis | 13–3 | Redbirds (6–6) | Sounds (6–6) | Sounds (137–114) | |
| 252 | July 11 | Nashville | 7–6 | Sounds (7–6) | Redbirds (6–7) | Sounds (138–114) | |
| 253 | July 12 | Nashville | 6–3 (11) | Redbirds (7–7) | Sounds (7–7) | Sounds (138–115) | |
| 254 | July 13 | Nashville | 5–4 | Redbirds (8–7) | Sounds (7–8) | Sounds (138–116) | |
| 255 | July 14 | Nashville | 3–2 | Redbirds (9–7) | Sounds (7–9) | Sounds (138–117) | |

2014: Tie (8–8); All-time: Sounds (146–125)

| No. | Date | Location | Score | Winning team (Season record) | Losing team (Season record) | All-time leader (Record) | Ref. |
|---|---|---|---|---|---|---|---|
| 256 | April 15 | Nashville | 8–4 | Redbirds (1–0) | Sounds (0–1) | Sounds (138–118) | |
| 257 | April 16 | Nashville | 7–1 | Redbirds (2–0) | Sounds (0–2) | Sounds (138–119) | |
| 258 | April 17 | Nashville | 5–4 | Sounds (1–2) | Redbirds (2–1) | Sounds (139–119) | |
| 259 | April 18 | Nashville | 5–1 | Sounds (2–2) | Redbirds (2–2) | Sounds (140–119) | |
| 260 | June 5 | Memphis | 7–4 | Redbirds (3–2) | Sounds (2–3) | Sounds (140–120) | |
| 261 | June 6 | Memphis | 1–0 | Sounds (3–3) | Redbirds (3–3) | Sounds (141–120) | |
| 262 | June 7 | Memphis | 4–3 | Sounds (4–3) | Redbirds (3–4) | Sounds (142–120) | |
| 263 | June 8 | Memphis | 9–4 | Redbirds (4–4) | Sounds (4–4) | Sounds (142–121) | |
| 264 | June 30 | Nashville | 9–4 | Sounds (5–4) | Redbirds (4–5) | Sounds (143–121) | |
| 265 | July 1 | Nashville | 8–5 | Sounds (6–4) | Redbirds (4–6) | Sounds (144–121) | |
| 266 | July 2 | Nashville | 5–0 | Sounds (7–4) | Redbirds (4–7) | Sounds (145–121) | |
| 267 | July 3 | Nashville | 7–5 | Redbirds (5–7) | Sounds (7–5) | Sounds (145–122) | |
| 268 | July 7 | Memphis | 2–1 | Redbirds (6–7) | Sounds (7–6) | Sounds (145–123) | |
| 269 | July 8 | Memphis | 4–2 | Sounds (8–6) | Redbirds (6–8) | Sounds (146–123) | |
| 270 | July 9 | Memphis | 8–1 | Redbirds (7–8) | Sounds (8–7) | Sounds (146–124) | |
| 271 | July 10 | Memphis | 1–0 | Redbirds (8–8) | Sounds (8–8) | Sounds (146–125) | |

2015: Tie (8–8); All-time: Sounds (154–133)

| No. | Date | Location | Score | Winning team (Season record) | Losing team (Season record) | All-time leader (Record) | Ref. |
|---|---|---|---|---|---|---|---|
| 272 | June 15 | Nashville | 5–2 | Redbirds (1–0) | Sounds (0–1) | Sounds (146–126) | |
| 273 | June 16 | Nashville | 7–1 | Sounds (1–1) | Redbirds (1–1) | Sounds (147–126) | |
| 274 | June 17 | Nashville | 7–5 | Redbirds (2–1) | Sounds (1–2) | Sounds (147–127) | |
| 275 | June 23 | Memphis | 6–4 | Sounds (2–2) | Redbirds (2–2) | Sounds (148–127) | |
| 276 | June 24 | Memphis | 9–4 | Redbirds (3–2) | Sounds (2–3) | Sounds (148–128) | |
| 277 | June 25 | Memphis | 5–0 | Sounds (3–3) | Redbirds (3–3) | Sounds (149–128) | |
| — | July 8 | Memphis | Postponed (travel issues). Rescheduled for July 9 as part of a doubleheader. | | | | |
| 278 | July 9 (1) | Memphis | 3–2 (7) | Sounds (4–3) | Redbirds (3–4) | Sounds (150–128) | |
| 279 | July 9 (2) | Memphis | 7–3 (7) | Sounds (5–3) | Redbirds (3–5) | Sounds (151–128) | |
| 280 | July 10 | Memphis | 9–1 | Redbirds (4–5) | Sounds (5–4) | Sounds (151–129) | |
| 281 | July 11 | Memphis | 5–4 | Redbirds (5–5) | Sounds (5–5) | Sounds (151–130) | |
| 282 | July 12 | Memphis | 12–3 | Redbirds (6–5) | Sounds (5–6) | Sounds (151–131) | |
| — | August 5 | Nashville | Suspended (rain). Continuation scheduled for August 6 as part of a doubleheader. (Note: The August 5, 2015, game was suspended due to rain in the middle of the first inning with the Sounds leading, 3–0. It was completed on August 6 prior to the regularly scheduled game, which had been shortened to seven innings.) | | | | |
| 283 | August 6 (1) | Nashville | 8–3 | Sounds (6–6) | Redbirds (6–6) | Sounds (152–131) | |
| 284 | August 6 (2) | Nashville | 8–0 (7) | Sounds (7–6) | Redbirds (6–7) | Sounds (153–131) | |
| 285 | August 7 | Nashville | 7–4 | Redbirds (7–7) | Sounds (7–7) | Sounds (153–132) | |
| 286 | August 8 | Nashville | 4–1 | Sounds (8–7) | Redbirds (7–8) | Sounds (154–132) | |
| 287 | August 9 | Nashville | 11–2 | Redbirds (8–8) | Sounds (8–8) | Sounds (154–133) | |

2016: Tie (8–8); All-time: Sounds (162–141)

| No. | Date | Location | Score | Winning team (Season record) | Losing team (Season record) | All-time leader (Record) | Ref. |
|---|---|---|---|---|---|---|---|
| 288 | May 6 | Nashville | 7–6 | Redbirds (1–0) | Sounds (0–1) | Sounds (154–134) | |
| 289 | May 7 | Nashville | 2–1 | Sounds (1–1) | Redbirds (1–1) | Sounds (155–134) | |
| 290 | May 8 | Nashville | 3–2 | Sounds (2–1) | Redbirds (1–2) | Sounds (156–134) | |
| 291 | May 9 | Nashville | 5–0 | Redbirds (2–2) | Sounds (2–2) | Sounds (156–135) | |
| 292 | June 13 | Nashville | 4–3 | Redbirds (3–2) | Sounds (2–3) | Sounds (156–136) | |
| 293 | June 14 | Nashville | 7–4 (10) | Redbirds (4–2) | Sounds (2–4) | Sounds (156–137) | |
| 294 | June 15 | Nashville | 16–3 | Sounds (3–4) | Redbirds (4–3) | Sounds (157–137) | |
| 295 | June 16 | Nashville | 5–2 | Redbirds (5–3) | Sounds (3–5) | Sounds (157–138) | |
| 296 | July 4 | Memphis | 2–1 (11) | Redbirds (6–3) | Sounds (3–6) | Sounds (157–139) | |
| 297 | July 5 | Memphis | 8–2 | Sounds (4–6) | Redbirds (6–4) | Sounds (158–139) | |
| 298 | July 6 | Memphis | 7–6 | Redbirds (7–4) | Sounds (4–7) | Sounds (158–140) | |
| 299 | August 24 | Memphis | 3–0 | Sounds (5–7) | Redbirds (7–5) | Sounds (159–140) | |
| 300 | August 25 | Memphis | 7–6 | Redbirds (8–5) | Sounds (5–8) | Sounds (159–141) | |
| 301 | August 26 | Memphis | 5–3 | Sounds (6–8) | Redbirds (8–6) | Sounds (160–141) | |
| 302 | August 27 | Memphis | 2–1 | Sounds (7–8) | Redbirds (8–7) | Sounds (161–141) | |
| 303 | August 28 | Memphis | 14–4 | Sounds (8–8) | Redbirds (8–8) | Sounds (162–141) | |

2017: Redbirds (8–6); All-time: Sounds (168–149)

| No. | Date | Location | Score | Winning team (Season record) | Losing team (Season record) | All-time leader (Record) | Ref. |
|---|---|---|---|---|---|---|---|
| 304 | June 9 | Memphis | 2–1 (10) | Redbirds (1–0) | Sounds (0–1) | Sounds (162–142) | |
| 305 | June 10 | Memphis | 6–3 | Sounds (1–1) | Redbirds (1–1) | Sounds (163–142) | |
| 306 | June 11 | Memphis | 10–9 (12) | Redbirds (2–1) | Sounds (1–2) | Sounds (163–143) | |
| 307 | July 7 | Nashville | 3–2 | Sounds (2–2) | Redbirds (2–2) | Sounds (164–143) | |
| 308 | July 8 | Nashville | 3–2 | Redbirds (3–2) | Sounds (2–3) | Sounds (164–144) | |
| 309 | July 9 | Nashville | 2–1 (10) | Redbirds (4–2) | Sounds (2–4) | Sounds (164–145) | |
| 310 | August 11 | Nashville | 3–1 | Sounds (3–4) | Redbirds (4–3) | Sounds (165–145) | |
| 311 | August 12 | Nashville | 6–1 | Redbirds (5–3) | Sounds (3–5) | Sounds (165–146) | |
| 312 | August 13 | Nashville | 12–7 | Redbirds (6–3) | Sounds (3–6) | Sounds (165–147) | |
| 313 | August 14 | Nashville | 3–1 | Redbirds (7–3) | Sounds (3–7) | Sounds (165–148) | |
| 314 | August 15 | Memphis | 6–5 | Sounds (4–7) | Redbirds (7–4) | Sounds (166–148) | |
| 315 | August 16 | Memphis | 3–2 | Redbirds (8–4) | Sounds (4–8) | Sounds (166–149) | |
| 316 | August 17 | Memphis | 11–8 | Sounds (5–8) | Redbirds (8–5) | Sounds (167–149) | |
| 317 | August 18 | Memphis | 8–7 | Sounds (6–8) | Redbirds (8–6) | Sounds (168–149) | |

2018: Sounds (9–7); All-time: Sounds (177–156)

| No. | Date | Location | Score | Winning team (Season record) | Losing team (Season record) | All-time leader (Record) | Ref. |
|---|---|---|---|---|---|---|---|
| 318 | May 4 | Nashville | 3–1 | Sounds (1–0) | Redbirds (0–1) | Sounds (169–149) | |
| 319 | May 5 | Nashville | 4–2 | Sounds (2–0) | Redbirds (0–2) | Sounds (170–149) | |
| 320 | May 6 | Nashville | 8–2 | Sounds (3–0) | Redbirds (0–3) | Sounds (171–149) | |
| 321 | May 7 | Nashville | 4–1 | Redbirds (1–3) | Sounds (3–1) | Sounds (171–150) | |
| 322 | May 12 | Memphis | 8–4 | Sounds (4–1) | Redbirds (1–4) | Sounds (172–150) | |
| 323 | May 13 | Memphis | 8–3 | Sounds (5–1) | Redbirds (1–5) | Sounds (173–150) | |
| 324 | May 14 | Memphis | 2–1 | Redbirds (2–5) | Sounds (5–2) | Sounds (173–151) | |
| 325 | May 15 | Memphis | 7–4 | Sounds (6–2) | Redbirds (2–6) | Sounds (174–151) | |
| 326 | August 24 | Memphis | 9–3 | Redbirds (3–6) | Sounds (6–3) | Sounds (174–152) | |
| 327 | August 25 | Memphis | 4–3 | Redbirds (4–6) | Sounds (6–4) | Sounds (174–153) | |
| 328 | August 26 | Memphis | 7–3 | Sounds (7–4) | Redbirds (4–7) | Sounds (175–153) | |
| 329 | August 27 | Memphis | 2–0 | Redbirds (5–7) | Sounds (7–5) | Sounds (175–154) | |
| 330 | August 31 | Nashville | 5–1 | Sounds (8–5) | Redbirds (5–8) | Sounds (176–154) | |
| 331 | September 1 | Nashville | 8–1 | Redbirds (6–8) | Sounds (8–6) | Sounds (176–155) | |
| 332 | September 2 | Nashville | 2–1 | Redbirds (7–8) | Sounds (8–7) | Sounds (176–156) | |
| 333 | September 3 | Nashville | 6–5 | Sounds (9–7) | Redbirds (7–9) | Sounds (177–156) | |

2019: Sounds (9–7); All-time: Sounds (186–163)

| No. | Date | Location | Score | Winning team (Season record) | Losing team (Season record) | All-time leader (Record) | Ref. |
|---|---|---|---|---|---|---|---|
| 334 | May 3 | Nashville | 17–2 | Redbirds (1–0) | Sounds (0–1) | Sounds (177–157) | |
| — | May 4 | Nashville | Postponed (rain). Rescheduled for May 5 as part of a doubleheader. | | | | |
| 335 | May 5 (1) | Nashville | 11–2 (7) | Redbirds (2–0) | Sounds (0–2) | Sounds (177–158) | |
| 336 | May 5 (2) | Nashville | 7–5 (7) | Sounds (1–2) | Redbirds (2–1) | Sounds (178–158) | |
| 337 | May 6 | Nashville | 6–5 | Sounds (2–2) | Redbirds (2–2) | Sounds (179–158) | |
| 338 | May 11 | Memphis | 7–5 | Redbirds (3–2) | Sounds (2–3) | Sounds (179–159) | |
| 339 | May 12 | Memphis | 7–2 | Redbirds (4–2) | Sounds (2–4) | Sounds (179–160) | |
| 340 | May 13 | Memphis | 5–3 | Sounds (3–4) | Redbirds (4–3) | Sounds (180–160) | |
| 341 | May 14 | Memphis | 9–3 | Redbirds (5–3) | Sounds (3–5) | Sounds (180–161) | |
| 342 | May 21 | Nashville | 4–2 | Redbirds (6–3) | Sounds (3–6) | Sounds (180–162) | |
| 343 | May 22 | Nashville | 10–0 | Redbirds (7–3) | Sounds (3–7) | Sounds (180–163) | |
| 344 | May 23 | Nashville | 8–5 | Sounds (4–7) | Redbirds (7–4) | Sounds (181–163) | |
| 345 | May 24 | Nashville | 10–6 | Sounds (5–7) | Redbirds (7–5) | Sounds (182–163) | |
| 346 | June 25 | Memphis | 10–4 | Sounds (6–7) | Redbirds (7–6) | Sounds (183–163) | |
| 347 | June 26 | Memphis | 17–11 | Sounds (7–7) | Redbirds (7–7) | Sounds (184–163) | |
| 348 | June 27 | Memphis | 3–2 | Sounds (8–7) | Redbirds (7–8) | Sounds (185–163) | |
| 349 | June 28 | Memphis | 3–1 | Sounds (9–7) | Redbirds (7–9) | Sounds (186–163) | |

2020: Season cancelled; All-time: Sounds (186–163)

| No. | Date | Location | Score | Winning team (Season record) | Losing team (Season record) | All-time leader (Record) | Ref. |
|---|---|---|---|---|---|---|---|
| — | May 16 | Nashville | Cancelled (COVID-19 pandemic). (Note: The 2020 season was cancelled due to the COVID-19 pandemic.) | | | | |
| — | May 17 | Nashville | Cancelled (COVID-19 pandemic). | | | | |
| — | May 18 | Nashville | Cancelled (COVID-19 pandemic). | | | | |
| — | May 19 | Nashville | Cancelled (COVID-19 pandemic). | | | | |
| — | May 26 | Memphis | Cancelled (COVID-19 pandemic). | | | | |
| — | May 27 | Memphis | Cancelled (COVID-19 pandemic). | | | | |
| — | May 28 | Memphis | Cancelled (COVID-19 pandemic). | | | | |
| — | May 29 | Memphis | Cancelled (COVID-19 pandemic). | | | | |
| — | July 20 | Nashville | Cancelled (COVID-19 pandemic). | | | | |
| — | July 21 | Nashville | Cancelled (COVID-19 pandemic). | | | | |
| — | July 22 | Nashville | Cancelled (COVID-19 pandemic). | | | | |
| — | July 23 | Nashville | Cancelled (COVID-19 pandemic). | | | | |
| — | September 4 | Memphis | Cancelled (COVID-19 pandemic). | | | | |
| — | September 5 | Memphis | Cancelled (COVID-19 pandemic). | | | | |
| — | September 6 | Memphis | Cancelled (COVID-19 pandemic). | | | | |
| — | September 7 | Memphis | Cancelled (COVID-19 pandemic). | | | | |

2021: Tie (9–9); All-time: Sounds (195–172)

| No. | Date | Location | Score | Winning team (Season record) | Losing team (Season record) | All-time leader (Record) | Ref. |
|---|---|---|---|---|---|---|---|
| 350 | May 11 | Nashville | 18–6 | Redbirds (1–0) | Sounds (0–1) | Sounds (186–164) | |
| 351 | May 12 | Nashville | 9–6 | Sounds (1–1) | Redbirds (1–1) | Sounds (187–164) | |
| 352 | May 13 | Nashville | 8–2 | Sounds (2–1) | Redbirds (1–2) | Sounds (188–164) | |
| 353 | May 14 | Nashville | 9–2 | Redbirds (2–2) | Sounds (2–2) | Sounds (188–165) | |
| 354 | May 15 | Nashville | 4–3 (10) | Sounds (3–2) | Redbirds (2–3) | Sounds (189–165) | |
| 355 | May 16 | Nashville | 4–3 | Redbirds (3–3) | Sounds (3–3) | Sounds (189–166) | |
| 356 | August 17 | Memphis | 5–1 | Redbirds (4–3) | Sounds (3–4) | Sounds (189–167) | |
| 357 | August 18 | Memphis | 7–6 (10) | Redbirds (5–3) | Sounds (3–5) | Sounds (189–168) | |
| 358 | August 19 | Memphis | 10–9 (10) | Redbirds (6–3) | Sounds (3–6) | Sounds (189–169) | |
| 359 | August 20 | Memphis | 5–3 | Sounds (4–6) | Redbirds (6–4) | Sounds (190–169) | |
| 360 | August 21 | Memphis | 4–3 | Redbirds (7–4) | Sounds (4–7) | Sounds (190–170) | |
| 361 | August 22 | Memphis | 13–12 | Sounds (5–7) | Redbirds (7–5) | Sounds (191–170) | |
| 362 | September 7 | Nashville | 9–7 | Sounds (6–7) | Redbirds (7–6) | Sounds (192–170) | |
| 363 | September 8 | Nashville | 6–4 | Sounds (7–7) | Redbirds (7–7) | Sounds (193–170) | |
| 364 | September 9 | Nashville | 5–0 | Sounds (8–7) | Redbirds (7–8) | Sounds (194–170) | |
| 365 | September 10 | Nashville | 8–2 | Sounds (9–7) | Redbirds (7–9) | Sounds (195–170) | |
| 366 | September 11 | Nashville | 6–5 | Redbirds (8–9) | Sounds (9–8) | Sounds (195–171) | |
| 367 | September 12 | Nashville | 6–3 | Redbirds (9–9) | Sounds (9–9) | Sounds (195–172) | |

2022: Sounds (12–9); All-time: Sounds (207–181)

| No. | Date | Location | Score | Winning team (Season record) | Losing team (Season record) | All-time leader (Record) | Ref. |
|---|---|---|---|---|---|---|---|
| 368 | June 14 | Memphis | 7–3 | Redbirds (1–0) | Sounds (0–1) | Sounds (195–173) | |
| 369 | June 15 | Memphis | 8–4 (10) | Sounds (1–1) | Redbirds (1–1) | Sounds (196–173) | |
| 370 | June 16 | Memphis | 7–6 | Redbirds (2–1) | Sounds (1–2) | Sounds (196–174) | |
| 371 | June 17 | Memphis | 4–1 | Sounds (2–2) | Redbirds (2–2) | Sounds (197–174) | |
| 372 | June 18 | Memphis | 5–3 | Sounds (3–2) | Redbirds (2–3) | Sounds (198–174) | |
| 373 | June 19 | Memphis | 7–6 | Redbirds (3–3) | Sounds (3–3) | Sounds (198–175) | |
| 374 | July 12 | Nashville | 2–1 | Redbirds (4–3) | Sounds (3–4) | Sounds (198–176) | |
| 375 | July 13 | Nashville | 3–2 | Redbirds (5–3) | Sounds (3–5) | Sounds (198–177) | |
| 376 | July 14 | Nashville | 19–4 | Redbirds (6–3) | Sounds (3–6) | Sounds (198–178) | |
| 377 | July 15 | Nashville | 4–3 (10) | Sounds (4–6) | Redbirds (6–4) | Sounds (199–178) | |
| 378 | July 16 | Nashville | 10–0 | Redbirds (7–4) | Sounds (4–7) | Sounds (199–179) | |
| 379 | July 17 | Nashville | 10–8 | Sounds (5–7) | Redbirds (7–5) | Sounds (200–179) | |
| 380 | August 30 | Nashville | 5–3 | Sounds (6–7) | Redbirds (7–6) | Sounds (201–179) | |
| 381 | August 31 | Nashville | 9–3 | Redbirds (8–6) | Sounds (6–8) | Sounds (201–180) | |
| 382 | September 1 | Nashville | 6–5 | Sounds (7–8) | Redbirds (8–7) | Sounds (202–180) | |
| 383 | September 2 | Nashville | 6–5 | Sounds (8–8) | Redbirds (8–8) | Sounds (203–180) | |
| 384 | September 3 | Nashville | 4–1 | Sounds (9–8) | Redbirds (8–9) | Sounds (204–180) | |
| 385 | September 4 | Nashville | 12–4 | Sounds (10–8) | Redbirds (8–10) | Sounds (205–180) | |
| 386 | September 26 | Nashville | 6–5 (11) | Sounds (11–8) | Redbirds (8–11) | Sounds (206–180) | |
| 387 | September 27 | Nashville | 9–4 | Sounds (12–8) | Redbirds (8–12) | Sounds (207–180) | |
| 388 | September 28 | Nashville | 8–3 | Redbirds (9–12) | Sounds (12–9) | Sounds (207–181) | |

2023: Sounds (13–5); All-time: Sounds (220–186)

| No. | Date | Location | Score | Winning team (Season record) | Losing team (Season record) | All-time leader (Record) | Ref. |
|---|---|---|---|---|---|---|---|
| 389 | April 4 | Memphis | 7–5 | Redbirds (1–0) | Sounds (0–1) | Sounds (207–182) | |
| — | April 5 | Memphis | Postponed (rain). Rescheduled for April 6 as part of a doubleheader. | | | | |
| 390 | April 6 (1) | Memphis | 4–0 (7) | Sounds (1–1) | Redbirds (1–1) | Sounds (208–182) | |
| 391 | April 6 (2) | Memphis | 2–0 (7) | Redbirds (2–1) | Sounds (1–2) | Sounds (208–183) | |
| 392 | April 7 | Memphis | 3–0 | Sounds (2–2) | Redbirds (2–2) | Sounds (209–183) | |
| 393 | April 8 | Memphis | 6–2 | Sounds (3–2) | Redbirds (2–3) | Sounds (210–183) | |
| 394 | April 9 | Memphis | 6–1 | Redbirds (3–3) | Sounds (3–3) | Sounds (210–184) | |
| 395 | June 28 | Memphis | 12–4 | Sounds (4–3) | Redbirds (3–4) | Sounds (211–184) | |
| 396 | June 29 | Memphis | 5–1 | Sounds (5–3) | Redbirds (3–5) | Sounds (212–184) | |
| 397 | June 30 | Memphis | 6–2 | Sounds (6–3) | Redbirds (3–6) | Sounds (213–184) | |
| 398 | July 1 | Memphis | 7–5 | Sounds (7–3) | Redbirds (3–7) | Sounds (214–184) | |
| 399 | July 2 | Memphis | 9–8 (10) | Redbirds (4–7) | Sounds (7–4) | Sounds (214–185) | |
| 400 | July 3 | Memphis | 8–2 | Sounds (8–4) | Redbirds (4–8) | Sounds (215–185) | |
| 401 | September 5 | Nashville | 6–2 | Sounds (9–4) | Redbirds (4–9) | Sounds (216–185) | |
| 402 | September 6 | Nashville | 4–1 | Sounds (10–4) | Redbirds (4–10) | Sounds (217–185) | |
| 403 | September 7 | Nashville | 7–6 | Sounds (11–4) | Redbirds (4–11) | Sounds (218–185) | |
| 404 | September 8 | Nashville | 8–4 | Redbirds (5–11) | Sounds (11–5) | Sounds (218–186) | |
| 405 | September 9 | Nashville | 8–7 | Sounds (12–5) | Redbirds (5–12) | Sounds (219–186) | |
| 406 | September 10 | Nashville | 10–7 | Sounds (13–5) | Redbirds (5–13) | Sounds (220–186) | |

2024: Tie (11–11); All-time: Sounds (231–197)

| No. | Date | Location | Score | Winning team (Season record) | Losing team (Season record) | All-time leader (Record) | Ref. |
|---|---|---|---|---|---|---|---|
| 407 | April 9 | Memphis | 15–2 (6) | Sounds (1–0) | Redbirds (0–1) | Sounds (221–186) | |
| — | April 10 | Memphis | Postponed (rain). Rescheduled for April 12 as part of a doubleheader. | | | | |
| 408 | April 11 | Memphis | 6–1 | Redbirds (1–1) | Sounds (1–1) | Sounds (221–187) | |
| 409 | April 12 (1) | Memphis | 6–0 (7) | Redbirds (2–1) | Sounds (1–2) | Sounds (221–188) | |
| 410 | April 12 (2) | Memphis | 9–0 (7) | Sounds (2–2) | Redbirds (2–2) | Sounds (222–188) | |
| 411 | April 13 | Memphis | 8–3 | Redbirds (3–2) | Sounds (2–3) | Sounds (222–189) | |
| 412 | April 14 | Memphis | 8–4 | Sounds (3–3) | Redbirds (3–3) | Sounds (223–189) | |
| 413 | May 28 | Memphis | 2–0 | Redbirds (4–3) | Sounds (3–4) | Sounds (223–190) | |
| 414 | May 29 | Memphis | 9–4 | Sounds (4–4) | Redbirds (4–4) | Sounds (224–190) | |
| 415 | May 30 | Memphis | 3–1 | Redbirds (5–4) | Sounds (4–5) | Sounds (224–191) | |
| 416 | May 31 | Memphis | 7–2 | Sounds (5–5) | Redbirds (5–5) | Sounds (225–191) | |
| 417 | June 1 | Memphis | 11–3 | Redbirds (6–5) | Sounds (5–6) | Sounds (225–192) | |
| 418 | June 2 | Memphis | 9–2 | Sounds (6–6) | Redbirds (6–6) | Sounds (226–192) | |
| 419 | July 1 | Memphis | 6–1 | Sounds (7–6) | Redbirds (6–7) | Sounds (227–192) | |
| 420 | July 2 | Memphis | 13–11 (10) | Redbirds (7–7) | Sounds (7–7) | Sounds (227–193) | |
| 421 | July 3 | Memphis | 4–3 (11) | Sounds (8–7) | Redbirds (7–8) | Sounds (228–193) | |
| 422 | July 4 | Nashville | 10–3 | Redbirds (8–8) | Sounds (8–8) | Sounds (228–194) | |
| 423 | July 5 | Nashville | 7–4 | Redbirds (9–8) | Sounds (8–9) | Sounds (228–195) | |
| 424 | July 6 | Nashville | 4–1 | Sounds (9–9) | Redbirds (9–9) | Sounds (229–195) | |
| 425 | September 10 | Nashville | 5–3 | Redbirds (10–9) | Sounds (9–10) | Sounds (229–196) | |
| 426 | September 11 | Nashville | 6–3 | Redbirds (11–9) | Sounds (9–11) | Sounds (229–197) | |
| — | September 12 | Nashville | Postponed (rain). Rescheduled for September 14 as part of a doubleheader. | | | | |
| 427 | September 13 | Nashville | 5–4 | Sounds (10–11) | Redbirds (11–10) | Sounds (230–197) | |
| — | September 14 (1) | Nashville | Cancelled (rain). | | | | |
| — | September 14 (2) | Nashville | Cancelled (rain). | | | | |
| 428 | September 15 | Nashville | 2–1 (10) | Sounds (11–11) | Redbirds (11–11) | Sounds (231–197) | |

2025: Sounds, 12–6; All-time: Sounds (243–203)

| No. | Date | Location | Score | Winning team (Season record) | Losing team (Season record) | All-time leader (Record) | Ref. |
|---|---|---|---|---|---|---|---|
| 429 | April 8 | Nashville | 8–0 | Sounds (1–0) | Redbirds (0–1) | Sounds (232–197) | |
| 430 | April 9 | Nashville | 3–0 | Sounds (2–0) | Redbirds (0–2) | Sounds (233–197) | |
| 431 | April 10 | Nashville | 8–3 | Redbirds (1–2) | Sounds (2–1) | Sounds (233–198) | |
| 432 | April 11 | Nashville | 7–1 | Sounds (3–1) | Redbirds (1–3) | Sounds (234–198) | |
| 433 | April 12 | Nashville | 6–2 | Sounds (4–1) | Redbirds (1–4) | Sounds (235–198) | |
| 434 | April 13 | Nashville | 5–1 | Redbirds (2–4) | Sounds (4–2) | Sounds (235–199) | |
| — | May 13 | Memphis | Postponed (wet grounds). Rescheduled for May 14 as part of a doubleheader. | | | | |
| 435 | May 14 (1) | Memphis | 11–0 (7) | Sounds (5–2) | Redbirds (2–5) | Sounds (236–199) | |
| 436 | May 14 (2) | Memphis | 5–0 (7) | Sounds (6–2) | Redbirds (2–6) | Sounds (237–199) | |
| 437 | May 15 | Memphis | 3–1 | Sounds (7–2) | Redbirds (2–7) | Sounds (238–199) | |
| 438 | May 16 | Memphis | 8–5 | Redbirds (3–7) | Sounds (7–3) | Sounds (238–200) | |
| 439 | May 17 | Memphis | 4–3 | Sounds (8–3) | Redbirds (3–8) | Sounds (239–200) | |
| 440 | May 18 | Memphis | 10–6 | Redbirds (4–8) | Sounds (8–4) | Sounds (239–201) | |
| 441 | July 1 | Nashville | 11–2 | Redbirds (5–8) | Sounds (8–5) | Sounds (239–202) | |
| 442 | July 2 | Nashville | 2–1 | Sounds (9–5) | Redbirds (5–9) | Sounds (240–202) | |
| 443 | July 3 | Nashville | 7–6 | Redbirds (6–9) | Sounds (9–6) | Sounds (240–203) | |
| 444 | July 4 | Memphis | 6–1 | Sounds (10–6) | Redbirds (6–10) | Sounds (241–203) | |
| 445 | July 5 | Memphis | 9–8 | Sounds (11–6) | Redbirds (6–11) | Sounds (242–203) | |
| 446 | July 6 | Memphis | 15–11 | Sounds (12–6) | Redbirds (6–12) | Sounds (243–203) | |

2026: Rebirds, 11–7; All-time: Sounds (250–214)

| No. | Date | Location | Score | Winning team (Season record) | Losing team (Season record) | All-time leader (Record) | Ref. |
|---|---|---|---|---|---|---|---|
| 447 | June 16 | Memphis | 12–5 | Redbirds (1–0) | Sounds (0–1) | Sounds (243–204) | |
| 448 | June 17 | Memphis | 10–8 | Sounds (1–1) | Redbirds (1–1) | Sounds (244–204) | |
| 449 | June 18 | Memphis | 7–3 | Redbirds (2–1) | Sounds (1–2) | Sounds (244–205) | |
| 450 | June 19 | Memphis | 4–1 | Redbirds (3–1) | Sounds (1–3) | Sounds (244–206) | |
| 451 | June 20 | Memphis | 17–3 | Sounds (2–3) | Redbirds (3–2) | Sounds (245–206) | |
| 452 | June 21 | Memphis | 10–8 | Redbirds (4–2) | Sounds (2–4) | Sounds (245–207) | |
| 453 | August 4 | Memphis | 13–2 | Redbirds (5–2) | Sounds (2–5) | Sounds (245–208) | |
| 454 | August 5 | Memphis | 5–4 | Redbirds (6–2) | Sounds (2–6) | Sounds (245–209) | |
| 455 | August 6 | Memphis | 2–1 | Sounds (3–6) | Redbirds (6–3) | Sounds (246–209) | |
| 456 | August 7 | Memphis | 5–3 | Sounds (4–6) | Redbirds (6–4) | Sounds (247–209) | |
| 457 | August 8 | Memphis | 4–3 | Sounds (5–6) | Redbirds (6–5) | Sounds (248–209) | |
| 458 | August 9 | Memphis | 7–3 | Redbirds (7–5) | Sounds (5–7) | Sounds (248–210) | |
| 459 | September 15 | Nashville | 5–4 (11) | Sounds (6–7) | Redbirds (7–6) | Sounds (249–210) | |
| 460 | September 16 | Nashville | 11–1 | Redbirds (8–6) | Sounds (6–8) | Sounds (249–211) | |
| 461 | September 17 | Nashville | 14–1 | Redbirds (9–6) | Sounds (6–9) | Sounds (249–212) | |
| 462 | September 18 | Memphis | 8–6 | Redbirds (10–6) | Sounds (6–10) | Sounds (249–213) | |
| 463 | September 19 | Memphis | 9–3 | Redbirds (11–6) | Sounds (6–11) | Sounds (249–214) | |
| 464 | September 20 | Memphis | 5–3 | Sounds (7–11) | Redbirds (11–7) | Sounds (250–214) | |

2027: TBD; All-time: Sounds (250–214)

| No. | Date | Location | Score | Winning team (Season record) | Losing team (Season record) | All-time leader (Record) | Ref. |
|---|---|---|---|---|---|---|---|
| 465 | April 27 | Nashville | — | — | — | — | |
| 466 | April 28 | Nashville | — | — | — | — | |
| 467 | April 29 | Nashville | — | — | — | — | |
| 468 | April 30 | Nashville | — | — | — | — | |
| 469 | May 1 | Nashville | — | — | — | — | |
| 470 | May 2 | Nashville | — | — | — | — | |
| 471 | June 15 | Nashville | — | — | — | — | |
| 472 | June 16 | Nashville | — | — | — | — | |
| 473 | June 17 | Nashville | — | — | — | — | |
| 474 | June 18 | Nashville | — | — | — | — | |
| 475 | June 19 | Nashville | — | — | — | — | |
| 476 | June 20 | Nashville | — | — | — | — | |
| 477 | July 6 | Memphis | — | — | — | — | |
| 478 | July 7 | Memphis | — | — | — | — | |
| 479 | July 8 | Memphis | — | — | — | — | |
| 480 | July 9 | Memphis | — | — | — | — | |
| 481 | July 10 | Memphis | — | — | — | — | |
| 482 | July 11 | Memphis | — | — | — | — | |
