= Grey Sox =

Grey Sox may refer to a number of defunct baseball teams in the Negro Southern League:

- Atlanta Black Crackers
- Bessemer Grey Sox
- Montgomery Grey Sox
