= New Zealand national team nomenclature based on the "All Blacks" =

Many of the national sports teams of New Zealand have been given nicknames, officially or otherwise, based on the iconic status of the All Blacks rugby team, and (mostly in the case of female teams) the silver tree fern (Cyathea dealbata) of their logo. The practice became controversial when Badminton New Zealand used the name "Black Cocks" for a period in 2004.

== Teams ==
Nickname	Team	Notes
All Blacks	Rugby union (men)	During the Originals tour a London newspaper reported that the New Zealanders played as if they were "all backs" which, due to a typographical error, subsequently became "All Blacks". However, the Express and Echo in Devon, reporting after the Originals match there, referred to "The All Blacks, as they are styled by reason of their sable and unrelieved costume."
All Whites	Football (men)	Named because the team wears white, due to a former FIFA regulation reserving black for referees.
Beach Blacks	Beach volleyball (men)	
Beach Ferns	Beach volleyball (women)	
Black Brooms	Quidditch/Quadball	Disbanded 2023
Black Caps	Cricket (men)	Since January 1998, after a competition to choose a name for the team.
Black Dragons	Dragon Boat	Since early 2017
Black Ferns	Rugby union (women)	
Black Fins	Surf Life Saving team (mixed gender)	
Black Fins	Underwater hockey (men)	
Black Foils	SailGP team	
Blackjacks/Black Jacks	Lawn Bowls (men and women)	derived from jack ball
Black Socks/Sox	Softball (men)	Also derived from similarly named American teams
Black Sticks	Field hockey (men and women)	
Diamondblacks	Baseball (men)	Also derived from the similarly named Major League Baseball team and a reference to a baseball diamond
E Blacks	Esports	
Football Ferns	Football (women)	
Futsal Whites/Futsalwhites	Futsal (men)	
Ice Blacks	Ice hockey (men)	
Ice Ferns	Ice hockey (women)	
Inline Ferns	Inline hockey (women)	
K-Blacks	Kilikiti	
Kiwi Ferns	Rugby league (women)	The men's team is known as the Kiwis
Mat Blacks	Indoor bowls (mixed gender)	In reference to the playing mat
Net Blacks	Netball (Men)	
Silver Ferns	Netball (women)	
Silver Fins	Underwater hockey (women)	
Silver Blades	Speed Skating	Named by Andrew Gous & Peter Michael in reference to the ice skate (speed skate) blades.
Steel Blacks/Iron Blacks	American football (men)	In reference to "gridiron", a common name for the playing fields in American and Canadian football.
Tall Blacks	Basketball (men)	In reference to the height of most professional basketball players
Tall Ferns	Basketball (women)	In reference to the height of most professional basketball players
Volley Blacks	Volleyball (men)	
Volley Ferns	Volleyball (women)	
Wheel Blacks	Wheelchair rugby (men)	
White Ferns	Cricket (women)	
White Socks/Sox	Softball (women)	Also derived from similarly named American teams
White Caps	Women's Water Polo	
