= Albany Giants =

Minor league Negro league baseball team

Information
- League: Negro Southern League (1926)
- Location: Albany, Georgia
- Established: 1926
- Disbanded: 1926

The Albany Giants were a minor league Negro league baseball team. They played in the city of Albany, Georgia as a member of the Negro Southern League during 1926.
