= New Zealand Surf Life Saving team =

The New Zealand Surf Life Saving team, also known as the Black Fins, is the mixed national team of New Zealand, and a member of the International Life Saving Federation. The "Black Fins" is one of many national team nicknames related to the All Blacks.

Below is the 2024 World Championships team.

- Steve Kent - Campaign Lead
- Fiona Hastie - Logistics Lead
- Andy McMillan - Pool Coach
- Kevin Morrison - Ocean Coach
- Arna Majstrovic - Beach Coach (Youth & Open teams)
- Tom Lowe - Assistant Pool Coach/Analyst
- Byron Reid - Competition Manager
- Dr Theo Dorfling - Team Doctor (Youth & Open teams)

Member	Club
Briana Irving	(New Zealand) Waikanae SLSC
Chris Dawson	(New Zealand) Midway SLSC
Cory Taylor	(New Zealand) Midway SLSC
Fergus Eadie	(New Zealand) Mairangi Bay SLSC
Joe Collins*	(New Zealand) Fitzroy SLSC
Louis Clark*	(New Zealand) Mairangi Bay SLSC
Madison Kidd	(New Zealand) Whangamatā SLSC
Molly Shivnan	(New Zealand) Omanu SLSC
Olivia Corrin	(New Zealand) Midway SLSC
Oska Smith*	(New Zealand) Lyall Bay SLSC
Rae Kwan*	(New Zealand) Ōrewa SLSC
Zoe Crawford*	(New Zealand) Mairangi Bay SLSC

In 2024 the Black Fins took second place overall. Black Fin Fergus Eadie (Mairangi Bay) broke two world records, in the Men's 100m Manikin Carry, with a time of 43.97 seconds, and in the Men's 50m Manikin Carry, with a time of 27.2 seconds. In the Women's 100m Manikin Tow, Zoe Crawford (Mairangi Bay) set a new world record of 55.30 seconds, only to have it broken by team-mate Madison Kidd (Whangamata) in the following heat in a time of 55.03 seconds.

The New Zealand records came from Black Fins Zoe Crawford in the 100m Manikin Carry with a time of 51.28s, Fergus Eadie in the 100m Rescue Medley with a time of 58.06s, Chris Dawson (Midway) in the 100m Manikin Tow with a time of 49.37s. In the team events, the Black Fins set national records in the Women's 4x 50m Medley Relay with a time of 1.38.94, the Men's 4x 50m Medley Relay with a time of 1.29.47, and the Women's 4x 50m Obstacle Relay team events with a time of 1.48.85.

Below is the 2012 World Championships team. They were the 2012 World Life Saving Champions.

- Head coach: Scott Bartlett
- Assistant coach: Jason Pocock
- Team Manager: Mark Weatherall
- Physio: Susan Perret

Pos.	No.	Member	Club
	2	Max Beattie	(New Zealand) Omanu SLSC
	6	Nikki Cox	(New Zealand) WestShore SLSC
	9	Steven Ferguson	(New Zealand) Piha SLSC
	7	Paul Cracroft-Wilson	(New Zealand) Fitzroy SLSC
	8	Devon Hallian	(New Zealand) Midway SLSC
	11	Chanel Hickman	(New Zealand) Mairangi Bay SLSC
	12	Natasha Hind	(New Zealand) Lyall bay SLSC
	13	Steven Kent	(New Zealand) Titahi Bay SLSC
	14	Samantha Lee	(New Zealand) Lyall Bay SLSC
	16	Andy McMillan	(New Zealand) St Clair SLSC
	18	Kevin Morrison	(New Zealand) Mairangi Bay SLSC
	19	Laura Quilter	(New Zealand) Wainui SLSC
