= Red Sox (disambiguation) =

The Boston Red Sox are a professional baseball team.

Red Sox may also refer to:

== Baseball ==
=== Active baseball teams ===
Boston Red Sox affiliates

- Dominican Summer League Red Sox, rookie-level
- Florida Complex League Red Sox, rookie-level
- Salem Red Sox, Class A-Advanced
- Worcester Red Sox, Triple-A

Other

- Brantford Red Sox, a team in Ontario playing in the Intercounty Baseball League
- Regina Red Sox, a team in Saskatchewan playing in the Western Canadian Baseball League
- Yarmouth–Dennis Red Sox, a collegiate summer baseball team playing in the Cape Cod Baseball League

=== Defunct baseball teams ===
- Allentown Red Sox
- Bristol Red Sox
- Fort Lauderdale Red Sox
- Greenville Red Sox
- Jamestown Red Sox
- Lynn Red Sox
- Marion Red Sox
- Memphis Red Sox
- Oneonta Red Sox
- Pawtucket Red Sox
- Pittsfield Red Sox
- Reading Red Sox
- San Jose Red Sox
- Scranton Red Sox
- Williamsport Red Sox
- Winter Haven Red Sox

=== Renamed baseball teams ===
- Bradenton Marauders, known as the Sarasota Red Sox from 1994 to 2004.
- Lynchburg Hillcats, known as the Lynchburg Red Sox from 1988 to 1994.
- New Britain Rock Cats, known as the Bristol Red Sox from 1973 to 1982.
- Winston-Salem Dash, known as the Winston-Salem Red Sox from 1961 to 1983.

== Other uses ==
- Red Sox Manawatu, a soccer and netball club based in Palmerston North, Manawatu, New Zealand
  - Red Sox (soccer) (later Riverside Red Sox), a former Palmerston North team which merged with others to become Red Sox Manawatu
- Red Sox Nation, fans of the Boston Red Sox

== See also ==
- Boston Red Stockings (disambiguation)
- Red socks (disambiguation)
