= Sock (disambiguation) =

A sock is a piece of clothing worn on the foot.

Sock or Socks may also refer to:

== Animals, characters and identities ==
- Sock puppet account, or sock, a deceptive identity
- Sockington (died 2022), a cat also known as Socks on Twitter
- Socks (cat) (c. 1989–2009), a White House pet of the Clinton family
- Socks (Blue Peter cat), a cat featured on a BBC television series from 2006 to 2013

== Arts, entertainment and media ==
- Sock!, a 1965 album by saxophonist Gene Ammons
- Socks (novel), a 1973 children's novel about a cat named Socks Bricker by Beverly Cleary
- Sock, a 2004 novel by Penn Jillette
- "Socks", a 2022 song by DaBaby from Baby on Baby 2
- "The Sock" (The Amazing World of Gumball), a 2011 episode of The Amazing World of Gumball
- Socks Heeler, one of the two cousins of Bluey and Bingo from the television series Bluey
- Bert "Sock" Wysocki, a fictional character in the television series Reaper
- The Sock, a statue in Loughborough, England

== People ==
- Jack Sock (born 1992), American professional tennis and pickleball player
- Wilfried Sock (born 1944), East German former ice hockey player
- Tony Byrne (boxer) (1930–2013), Irish boxer known as Socks Byrne
- Joseph Lanza (1904–1968), Italian-American mafiosi known as Joseph "Socks" Lanza
- Socks Seibold (1896–1965), American baseball pitcher
- Socks Seybold (1870–1921), American baseball outfielder

== Other uses ==
- SOCKS, an Internet protocol
- Sock (anatomy), the lower part of a horse's foot and specifically its color
- Strike (attack) (slang: sock)
- Sock, a symbol of comedy in ancient Greek theatre; see Sock and buskin
- Socks Glacier, in Ross Dependency of Antarctica

== See also ==
- Socks the Cat Rocks the Hill, a 2018 video game featuring a fictionalization of the White House cat
- Dear Socks, Dear Buddy, a book of letters written to the White House cat and dog
- Sox (disambiguation)
