= Red socks =

Red socks are red-coloured socks

Red socks or Red Socks may also refer to:

- The "lucky red socks" worn in a public support campaign for yachtsman Sir Peter Blake
- "Red Socks", an episode from the ninth season of the TV series 7th Heaven
- The name of Greg Heffley's soccer team in Diary of a Wimpy Kid: The Last Straw

== See also ==
- Red Sox (disambiguation)
- "Red Socks Pugie", a 2008 single by Foals
- "I Don't Wanna Cry No More", an instrumental by Helloween which includes a long jam called "Red Socks and the Smell of Trees"
- Redstockings, a radical feminist group
