= Blue Sox =

Blue Sox may refer to a number of sports teams:

== Active baseball teams ==
- Butler BlueSox
- Shenzhen Bluesox
- Sydney Blue Sox
- Valley Blue Sox

== Defunct baseball teams ==
- Abilene Blue Sox
- Bet Shemesh Blue Sox
- Covington Blue Sox
- Davenport Blue Sox
- Denison Blue Sox
- Elkhart Blue Sox
- Martinsburg Blue Sox
- South Bend Blue Sox
- Utica Blue Sox

== See also ==
- Thetford Unicanvas, formerly Thetford Mines Blue Sox, a team in the LBMQ
- Halifax Panthers, a rugby league team that was briefly known as the Halifax Blue Sox
