= Nashville White Sox =

Information
- League: Negro Southern League
- Location: Nashville, Tennessee
- Established: 1920

The Nashville White Sox were a Negro league baseball team that played as charter members of the Negro Southern League in 1920. They were located in Nashville, Tennessee, and played their home games at Sulphur Dell. Managed by Marshall Garrett, the White Sox compiled a win–loss record of 40–40 (.500), placing sixth of eight teams, in their only season of competition.
