= Silver Sox =

Silver Sox can refer to three professional baseball teams:

- Reno Silver Sox, a former minor league baseball team based in Reno, Nevada from 1948-1992.
- The second Reno Silver Sox, a former independent league baseball team that played in the Golden Baseball League from 2005-2008.
- Saskatchewan Silver Sox, an active minor league baseball team in the Arizona Winter League.
