= White Sox (disambiguation) =

White Sox primarily refers to the Chicago White Sox, a professional baseball team.

White Sox or White socks may also refer to:

== Sports ==
=== Active baseball and softball teams ===
- New Zealand women's national softball team

=== Defunct baseball teams ===
- GCL White Sox
- Evansville White Sox
- Glens Falls White Sox
- Louisville White Sox
- Monroe White Sox
- Philadelphia White Stockings
- Tampa White Sox
- Wisconsin Rapids White Sox

=== Renamed baseball teams ===
- Bradenton Marauders, known as the Sarasota White Sox 1989–93.
- Bristol Pirates, known as the Bristol White Sox 1995–2013.
- Chicago Cubs, originally known as the Chicago White Stockings 1870-71 and 1874–89.
- Great Falls Voyagers, known as the Great Falls White Sox 2003–07.
- Lockport Locks, known as the Lockford White Sox 1942–43.
- Lynchburg Hillcats, known as the Lynchburg White Sox 1963–69.
- South Bend Silver Hawks, known as the South Bend White Sox 1988–93.
- Tennessee Smokies, known as the Knoxville White Sox 1972–80.

== Other uses ==
- White-coloured socks
- White-socks, an animal in J. R. R. Tolkien's Middle-earth legendarium
- White socks (insect), also known as a black fly, any member of the insect family Simuliidae
- Dirk Wears White Sox, 1979 debut album of Adam and the Ants
- "Dirk Wears White Socks" an early song also by Adam and the Ants not featured on the namesake album
