= Black Sox (disambiguation) =

The Black Sox Scandal was a 1919 Major League Baseball gambling scandal.

Black Sox or Black Socks may also refer to:

- Curse of the Black Sox, a long-persisting sports curse associated with the Black Sox scandal
- Black Socks, the New Zealand men's softball team
- Baltimore Black Sox, a former Negro league baseball team
- Les Chaussettes Noires (The Black Socks), a French rock and roll band
- Blacksocks, a European sock retailer

== See also ==
- Sock
