= Green Sox =

Green Sox may refer to a number of defunct baseball teams:

- Chicago Green Sox, in the United States Baseball League in 1912
- Cleveland Green Sox, in the Federal League in 1913
- Dublin Green Sox, in the Georgia State League from 1949-1952
- Fremont Green Sox, in the Ohio State League from 1938-1941
- Greensburg Green Sox, in the Pennsylvania State Association from 1937-1938
- Springfield Green Sox, in the Eastern League in 1917
