= Bessemer Stars =

Information
- League: Negro Southern League (1921, 1927)
- Location: Bessemer, Alabama
- Ballpark: Garfield Park (1921)
- Established: 1921
- Disbanded: 1927
- Nickname(s): Bessemer Stars (1921); Bessemer Grey Sox (1927)

The Bessemer Stars was the initial nickname of Negro leagues baseball team based in Bessemer, Alabama in the 1921 and 1927 seasons. The Bessemer Stars played as members of the 1921 Negro Southern League, while the Bessemer Grey Sox joined the league in 1927.

== History ==
The 1921 Bessemer Stars began the season as charter members of the 1921 Negro Southern League, in its first season of play. The Bessemer Stars, along with the Gadsen Giants and Mobile Braves played briefly as members of the 1921 Negro Southern League, before folding. As all three teams failed to complete the season schedule, their final records were not counted in the final standings and are unknown. The Nashville Elite Giants won the 1921 Negro Southern League championship.

In 1927, the Bessemer Grey Sox rejoined in the Negro Southern League. Other league members were the Atlanta Black Crackers, Chattanooga Black Lookouts, Evansville Louis Reichert Giants, Hopkinsville Athletics and Nashville Elite Giants. As per the final reported standings published in the Chicago Defender on June 25, 1927, the Grey Sox had a record of 4–5, playing behind the 1st place Chattanooga Black Lookouts who were 22–8. It is possible the Negro Southern League played a fragmented schedule in the second half of the 1927 season. The league did not play in the 1928 season, before resuming without a Bessemer team in 1929.

== The ballpark ==
The 1921 Bessemer Stars played home games at Garfield Park.

== Notable alumni ==
- Roster information for the Bessemer Stars and Bessemer Grey Sox teams is unknown.
- Bessemer, Alabama native George Harney was a star player in the Negro Leagues for the Chicago American Giants,
