= Gold Sox =

Gold Sox can refer to two professional baseball teams:

- The Amarillo Gold Sox, of the American Association.
- The Yuba-Sutter Gold Sox, a wooden bat collegiate summer league team.
