= Boston Red Stockings =

Boston Red Stockings may refer to:

- The Boston Red Stockings of the National Association, established in 1871. Later a charter franchise of the National League (1876), the team has been based in Georgia since 1966 as the Atlanta Braves.
- The Boston Red Stockings of the Players' League in 1890 and the American Association in 1891. The team was called "Reds" more often than "Red Stockings".

== See also ==
- Boston Reds, a team of the Union Association in 1884, also called the "Unions"
- Boston Red Sox, a charter franchise of the American League (1901). First called the "Americans", the franchise has been known as the Red Sox since 1908. The team's logo includes red stockings, although the team has never been known by that name.
