= Negro Southern League (1920–1936) =

American baseball league

- Classification: Minor league
- Sport: Negro league baseball
- Founded: 1920
- Folded: 1936
- No. of teams: 6-8 per season (~44 total)
- Country: United States
- Most titles: Nashville Elite Giants (4) Birmingham Black Barons (3)

Notes
- 1932 is considered the only year of "major league" status; League did not organize for the 1924–25, 28, or 1930 seasons

The Negro Southern League (NSL) was one of the several Negro baseball leagues created during the time organized baseball was segregated. The NSL was organized as a minor league in 1920 and lasted until 1936. It is considered a major league for the 1932 season and it was the only organized league to finish its full schedule that season (primarily due to the Great Depression). Prior to the season, several established teams joined the NSL, mainly from the collapsed Negro National League.

== League history ==
=== Founding ===
The Negro Southern League was a Negro baseball league organized by Tom Wilson in 1920 as a minor league. Leagues in the depression-era Southern United States were far less organized and lucrative than those in the north, owing to a smaller population base and a lower standard of living. The NSL operated on an irregular basis as each season's schedule was depended upon the availability of the more prominent team owners who were quick to seek more profitable avenues whenever possible.

=== Hiatuses ===
The NSL did not organize a schedule for the 1924, 1925 or 1928 seasons due to the Birmingham Black Barons and Memphis Red Sox participating in the Negro National League those years. The remaining NSL teams all played independent schedules those years. The 1929 season was poorly attended and teams struggled to complete their schedules; Birmingham and Memphis did not participate. For the 1930 season, the Nashville Elite Giants and Louisville Black Caps left for the NNL; this, and the continued absence of Birmingham and Memphis, led to the 1930 season being scrapped. The remaining NSL teams played independent schedules that year, while the New Orleans Caulfield Ads moved to the Texas–Louisiana League.

=== Level of play ===
For most of its existence, the NSL was considered a minor league, with some teams providing talent to more profitable Negro league teams. The most notable example is the Monroe Monarchs acting as a farm team for the Kansas City Monarchs.

The Negro National League collapsed for good after the 1931 season and many players (and two teams) migrated to the NSL. The Great Depression had decimated the profits of most Negro league teams and only a few organized Negro leagues survived; the newly formed East-West League also folded in mid-1932. The NSL was considered the highest quality surviving league and it therefore became the de facto major league for the 1932 season. The NSL was the only organized league to complete their full schedule.

With the creation of a new Negro National League in 1933, many players and some teams left the NSL and it slipped back into being regarded as having minor league status.

=== Legacy ===
When the NSL collapsed for the last time after the 1936 season, some of its member teams folded as well, but a handful of the teams continued on. The Nashville Elite Giants excelled in the new Negro National League for years, while the Memphis Red Sox and Birmingham Black Barons excelled in the Negro American League, which was newly organized in time for the 1937 season and absorbed some NSL teams when the league collapsed.

On the eve of integration in 1945, a new minor Negro league was organized with teams in the South; it assumed the name of the old league and also called itself the Negro Southern League. This second NSL lasted until 1951.

== Negro Southern League franchises ==
Eight franchises competed in what many consider the first "minor league" season in 1920. They were the Montgomery Grey Sox, Atlanta Black Crackers, New Orleans Caulfield Ads, Knoxville Giants, Birmingham Black Barons, Nashville White Sox, Pensacola Giants and Jacksonville Stars. Below is a list of teams that competed in the Negro Southern League.

Negro Southern League (1920–1923, 1926–1927, 1929, 1931–1936)
Team	Years in league	Notes
Knoxville Giants	1920–1922, 1931–1932	• Only played in 2nd half of 1932 season and just as an associate team
Montgomery Grey Sox	1920–1922, 1926, 1931–1933, 1935–36	• Also known as Gray Sox • Replaced Monroe Monarchs during 1st half of 1933
Atlanta Black Crackers	1920–21, 1926–27, 1929, 1932, 1935–36	• Alternately called Cubs 1st half of 1926 • Called Grey Sox 1929
Birmingham Black Barons	1920–21, 1923, 1926, 1931–32, 1934–1936	• Only played in 1st half of 1932 season
New Orleans Caulfield Ads	1920–1922, 1926, 1929, 1935	• Also called Black Pelicans 1st half of 1926 • Only played 1st half of 1922 season
Jacksonville Stars	1920	
Pensacola Giants	1920	
Nashville Elite Giants	1921–1923, 1926–27, 1929, 1931–32	
Nashville White Sox	1920	• Possibly same franchise as or related to Elite Giants
Chattanooga Tigers	1921–22	
Chattanooga	1920	• Associate team only • Possibly same franchise as or related to Tigers
Louisville	1920	• Associate team only
Memphis Red Sox	1920–1923, 1926, 1931–1936	• Associate team 1920
Bessemer (AL) Stars	1921	• Only played in 1st half of season
Gadsden (AL) Giants	1921	• Only played in 1st half of season
Mobile Braves	1921	• Only played in 1st half of season
New Orleans Crescent Stars	1922–23, 1933–34	• Replaced Caulfield Ads for 2nd half of 1922 season
Louisville Stars	1922	• Also called White Sox
Albany (GA) Giants	1926	
Chattanooga Black Lookouts	1926–27, 1929, 1931, 1935–36	• Called White Sox for 1st half of 1926 season • Called Black Cats for 1929 season
Evansville Reichert Giants	1927, 1929	• Called Evansville Louis Reichert Giants 1927
Bessemer (AL) Grey Sox	1927	
Hopkinsville (KY) Athletics	1927, 1936	• The 1927 and 1936 teams are possibly separate teams • Only played 1st half of 1936 season
Jackson (TN) Cubs	1927	
Louisville Black Caps	1929, 1932	• Also called Black Cats 1929 • Disbanded mid-season 1932
Atlanta Panthers	1931	• Only played in 2nd half of season
Columbus Turf Club	1932	
Cole's American Giants	1932	
Monroe Monarchs	1932–1934	• Only played 1st half of 1933 season
Little Rock Grays	1932	
Little Rock Black Travelers	1931	• Dropped out before end of 1931 season
Indianapolis ABCs	1932	
Cleveland Cubs	1932	
Lexington (KY) Hard Hitters	1932	• Replaced Birmingham Black Barons during 1st half of season
Kansas City Monarchs	1932	• Associate team only
Alcoa Aluminum Sluggers	1932	• Only played in 2nd half of season and just as an associate team
Shreveport Cubs	1933	
Algiers (LA) Giants	1933	
Little Rock Stars	1933	
Jackson (TN) Senators	1933	• Also called Bear Cats • Only played 1st half of season
Alexandria (LA) Lincoln Giants	1933	
Pine Bluff (AR) Boosters	1933	• Replaced Jackson Senators for 2nd half of season
Cincinnati Tigers	1934, 1936	
Atlanta Athletics	1934	
Claybrook (AR) Tigers	1935	
Louisville Caps	1934	• Also called Black Sox
Nashville Black Vols	1936	• Also called Elite Giants

- Note: An "associate team" is one who is not a member of the league, but games played against them by league teams count in the league standings.

=== 1932: Major league status ===
Nine franchises competed in the league in 1932, the sole season the Negro Southern League was considered a major Negro league:

- Atlanta Black Crackers
- Cole's American Giants
- Columbus Turf Club; joined league in July
- Indianapolis ABCs
- Louisville Black Caps; folded in August
- Memphis Red Sox
- Monroe Monarchs
- Montgomery Grey Sox
- Nashville Elite Giants

=== Member timeline ===
Below is a timeline of teams that played more than one season in the NSL:

- 1920 – Formation of NSL consisting of 8 teams: Montgomery Grey Sox, Atlanta Black Crackers, New Orleans Caulfield Ads, Knoxville Giants, Birmingham Black Barons, Nashville White Sox, Pensacola Giants and Jacksonville Stars.
- 1921 – Dropped: Nashville White Sox, Pensacola Giants and Jacksonville Stars; Added: Nashville Elite Giants, Memphis Red Sox and Chattanooga Tigers.
- 1922 – Dropped: Atlanta Black Crackers, Birmingham Black Barons and New Orleans Caulfield Ads (mid-June); Added: Louisville Stars and New Orleans Crescent Stars (mid-June).
- 1923 – Dropped: Knoxville Giants, Louisville Stars, Montgomery Grey Sox and Chattanooga Tigers; Added: Birmingham Black Barons.
- (1924) – no schedule played
- (1925) – no schedule played
- 1926 – Dropped: New Orleans Crescent Stars; Added: New Orleans Caulfield Ads, Albany Giants, Montgomery Grey Sox, Atlanta Black Crackers and Chattanooga Black Lookouts.
- 1927 – Dropped: Birmingham Black Barons, Memphis Red Sox, Albany Giants, Montgomery Grey Sox and New Orleans Caulfield Ads; Added: Evansville Louis Reichert Giants, Bessemer Grey Sox, Hopkinsville Athletics and Jackson Cubs.
- (1928) – no schedule played
- 1929 – Dropped: Bessemer Grey Sox, Hopkinsville Athletics and Jackson Cubs; Added: Louisville Black Caps and New Orleans Caulfield Ads.
- (1930) – no schedule played
- 1931 – Dropped: Evansville Louis Reichert Giants, Atlanta Black Crackers, Louisville Black Caps and New Orleans Caulfield Ads; Added: Birmingham Black Barons, Memphis Red Sox, Knoxville Giants and Montgomery Grey Sox.
- 1932 – Dropped: Chattanooga Black Lookouts and Knoxville Giants; Added: Cole's American Giants, Columbus Turf Club, Monroe Monarchs, Little Rock Grays, Louisville Black Caps (folded in August), Indianapolis ABC's, Atlanta Black Crackers and Cleveland Cubs.
- 1933 – Dropped: Cole's American Giants, Columbus Turf Club, Nashville Elite Giants, Little Rock Grays, Indianapolis ABC's, Birmingham Black Barons, Atlanta Black Crackers and Cleveland Cubs; Added: Little Rock Stars, New Orleans Crescent Stars, Shreveport Cubs, Algiers Giants, Jackson Senators and Alexandria Lincoln Giants.
- 1934 – Dropped: Little Rock Stars, Shreveport Cubs, Algiers Giants, Jackson Senators and Alexandria Lincoln Giants; Added: Cincinnati Tigers, Birmingham Black Barons and Louisville Caps.
- 1935 – Dropped: Monroe Monarchs, Louisville Caps, Cincinnati Tigers and New Orleans Crescent Stars; Added: Claybrook Tigers, New Orleans Caulfield Ads, Atlanta Black Crackers, Chattanooga Black Lookouts and Montgomery Grey Sox.
- 1936 – Dropped: Claybrook Tigers and New Orleans Caulfield Ads; Added: Cincinnati Tigers, Nashville Black Vols and Hopkinsville Athletics. League fell apart before second-half ended.

== League champions ==
Most seasons were split in halves, with the winner of the first half of the season playing the winner of the second half of the season in a formal league play-off that decided the Pennant winner. For some years it is unclear if a split season was played and if the second half schedule was completed. In the below list, the first half winner is noted with a raised "1" and the second half winner is noted with a raised "2".

=== Pennant winners ===
- 1920: Montgomery Grey Sox (Note: Disputed by Nashville White Sox)
- 1921: Nashville Elite Giants
- 1922: Nashville Elite Giants
- 1923: Birmingham Black Barons (Note: 1st half only, no 2nd half, season ended)
- (1924): no schedule played
- (1925): no schedule played
- 1926: Birmingham Black Barons
- 1927: Chattanooga Black Lookouts (Note: 1st half only, no 2nd half, season ended (Nashville Elite Giants were also recognized as winning the 1st half))
- (1928): no schedule played
- 1929: Nashville Elite Giants
- (1930): no schedule played
- 1931: Nashville Elite Giants
- 1932: Cole's American Giants
- 1933: Memphis Red Sox^{(1st half)} /
  New Orleans Crescent Stars^{(2nd half)}
- 1934: Undetermined
- 1935: Claybrook Tigers
- 1936: Birmingham Black Barons (Note: 1st half only, no 2nd half, season ended)

=== League playoffs ===
- 1921: Nashville Elite Giants defeated Montgomery Grey Sox, 4g-1g
- 1926: Birmingham Black Barons^{1} defeated Memphis Red Sox^{2}, 5g-2g (3 ties)
- 1932: Cole's American Giants^{1} (Note: Disputed by Monroe Monarchs) defeated Nashville Elite Giants^{2}, 5g-3g
- 1935: Claybrook Tigers^{2} (Note: No 2nd half standings have been found, but since Claybrook took place in the end-of-season play-off, they are assumed to have been the 2nd half champions.) defeated Memphis Red Sox^{1}, 4g-3g

=== Negro Dixie Series ===
The Negro Dixie Series was an informal "championship" series between a top NSL team and the champion of one of the various Texas-based Negro leagues. Oddly, the NSL participant was usually not the league champion.

- 1927: Nashville Elite Giants (NSL) defeated Dallas Black Giants (of the Negro Texas League), 4g-1g
- 1931: Monroe Monarchs (of the Texas–Louisiana Negro League) defeated Nashville Elite Giants (NSL), no details
- 1932: Monroe Monarchs (NSL) defeated Austin (of the Texas–Louisiana Negro League), 4g-2g
- 1933: New Orleans Crescent Stars (NSL) tied Nashville Elite Giants (of the NNL2), 4g-4g
  - 1933 (first round): New Orleans Crescent Stars defeated Houston Black Buffaloes (of the Negro Texas League), 4g-0g

After the completion of the 1933 Negro Dixie Series, the Chicago American Giants challenged the Crescent Stars to a "self-proclaimed" Negro World Series. The American Giants had their claim to the NNL first-half title dismissed by the league president, who also happened to be the owner of the team who did claim the first-half title (Pittsburgh Crawfords). In response, Chicago held their own championship series, and defeated the Crescent Stars, 5 games to 1.
